The list of reptiles of South Africa is a list of species that form a part of the reptilian fauna of South Africa. The list follows the SANBI listing.

Crocodylia 
Order Crocodylia

Crocodylidae 
Family Crocodylidae
 Genus Crocodylus:
 Crocodylus niloticus Laurenti, 1768, Nile crocodile, syn. Crocodilus madagascariensis Grandidier, 1872, Crocodilus vulgaris madagascariensis Boettger, 1877
 Crocodylus niloticus chamses  Bory, 1824, Nile crocodile		
 Crocodylus niloticus cowiei (Smith in Hewitt, 1937), Nile crocodile, syn. Alligator cowiei Smith 1937	
 Crocodylus niloticus madagascariensis  Grandidier, 1872, Nile crocodile		
 Crocodylus niloticus niloticus Laurenti, 1768, Nile crocodile, syn. Crocodilus complanatus Geoffroy 1827, Crocodilus hexaphractos Rüppell 1886, Crocodilus lacunosus Geoffroy 1827, Crocodilus marginatus Geoffroy 1827, Crocodilus multiscutatus Rüppell 1826, Crocodilus octophractus Rüppell 1831, Crocodilus vulgaris Cuvier 1807, Crocodylus niloticus Laurenti, 1768	
 Crocodylus niloticus pauciscutatus  Deraniyagala, 1948, Nile crocodile		
 Crocodylus niloticus suchus  Geoffroy, 1807, Nile crocodile, syn. Crocodylus suchus Schmitz 2003

Squamata 
Order Squamata

Agamidae 
Family Agamidae
 Genus Acanthocercus:
 Acanthocercus atricollis Smith, 1849, southern tree agama, syn. Acanthocercus atricollis Joger, 1991, Acanthocercus atricollis atricollis (Smith, 1849), Acanthocercus atricollis gregorii (Klausewitz, 1957), Acanthocercus atricollis kiwuensis (Klausewitz, 1957), Acanthocercus atricollis loveridge (Klausewitz, 1957), Acanthocercus atricollis minutus (Klausewitz, 1957), Acanthocercus atricollis ugandaensis (Klausewitz, 1957), Agama atricollis Smith 1849, Agama atricollis atricollis (Klausewitz, 1957), Agama atricollis gregorii (Klausewitz, 1957), Agama atricollis kiwuensis (Klausewitz, 1957), Agama atricollis loveridge (Klausewitz, 1957), Agama atricollis loveridgei (Klausewitz, 1957), Agama atricollis ugandaensis (Klausewitz, 1957), Agama cyanocephala Falk, 1925, Agama gregorii Günther, 1894, Laudakia atricollis Manthey & Schuster, 1999, Laudakia atricollis kuwuensis Manthey & Schuster, 1999, Stellio atricollis Broadley & Howell, 1991, Stellio capensis Duméril- Duméril et al., 1851, Stellio nigricollis Bocage, 1866	
 Acanthocercus  atricollis gregorii (Klausewitz, 1957), blue-throated agama, syn. Agama atricollis Smith, 1849, Agama atricollis gregorii Klausewitz, 1957, Agama gregorii Günther, 1894 	
 Acanthocercus  atricollis kiwuensis (Klausewitz, 1957), blue-throated agama, syn. Agama atricollis Smith, 1849, Agama atricollis kiwuensis Klausewits, 1957 	
 Acanthocercus  atricollis ugandaensis (Klausewitz, 1957), blue-throated agama, syn. Stellio atricollis Lanza, 1990, Agama atricollis ugandaensis Klausewitz, 1957 	
 Acanthocercus atricollis loveridgei (Klausewitz, 1957), blue-throated agama, Agama atricollis Smith, 1849, Agama atricollis loveridgei Klausewitz, 1957 	
 Acanthocercus atricollis atricollis (A. Smith, 1849), blue-throated agama, syn. Agama atricollis Smith, 1849, Agama atricollis atricollis Klausewitz, 1957, Agama cyanocephala Falk, 1925, Stellio capensis Duméril, 1851, Stellio nigricollis Barboza, 1866	
 Genus Agama:
 Agama aculeata Merrem, 1820, ground agama, syn. Agama hispida aculeata Fitzsimmons, 1958, Agama infralineata, Saura spinalis Wagler, 1866
 Agama aculeata aculeata Merrem, 1820, ground agama, Saura spinalis Wagler, 1866, Agama hispida aculeata Loveridge, 1936, endemic to southern Africa
 Agama aculeata distanti (Boulenger, 1902), ground agama, syn. Agama aculeata Duméril & Bibron, 1837, Agama distanti Boulenger, 1902, Agama hispida distanti Boulenger 1902, endemic
 Agama anchietae Bocage, 1896, western rock agama, syn. Agama anchietae methueni Boulenger & Power, 1921, Agama anchietae anchietae Auerbach, 1987 	
 Agama armata Peters, 1855, tropical spiny agama, syn. Agama hispida armata Boulenger, 1921, Agama hispida mertensi Wermuth, 1967, Agama aculeata armata Auerbach, 1987	
 Agama atra Daudin, 1802, southern rock agama, syn. Agama ater Gray, 1831, syn. Agama microterolepis Boulenger, 1896, Phrynopsis atra Fitzinger, 1843, Saura spinalis Wagler, 1833, endemic to southern Africa
 Agama  atra atra  Daudin, 1802, southern rock agama, Saura spinalis Wagler, 1833	
 Agama  atra knobeli Boulenger & Power, 1921, southern rock agama, syn. Agama ater Gray, 1831, Agama knobeli, Agama anchietae knobeli Boulenger, 1921 
 Agama hispida (Kaup, 1827), common spiny agama, syn. Agama brachyura Boulenger, 1885, Lacerta hispida Linnaeus, 1758, Trapelus hispidus Kaup, 1827, near endemic
 Agama hispida hispida  Kaup, 1827, common spiny agama. syn, Agama hispida Boulenger, 1885 	
 Agama  hispida makarikari Fitzsimons, 1932, common spiny agama, syn. Trapelus hispidus Kaup, 1827, Agama makarikarica Barts, 2003, Agama hispida makarikarica Auerbach, 1987 	
 Agama kirkii Boulenger, 1885, Kirk's rock agama		
 Agama kirkii fitzsimonsi Loveridge, 1950, Kirk's Rock agama		
 Agama kirkii kirkii Boulenger, 1885, Kirk's rock agama

Amphisbaenidae 
Family Amphisbaenidae
 Genus Chirindia:
 Chirindia langi (Fitzsimons, 1939), Lang's worm lizard
 Chirindia langi langi (Fitzsimons, 1939), Lang's worm lizard, syn Chirindia langi Fitzsimons, 1939, near endemic
 Chirindia langi occidentalis Jacobsen, 1984, Soutpansberg worm lizard, endemic
 Genus Dalophia:
 Dalophia pistillum (Boettger, 1895), blunt-tailed worm lizard, syn Monopeltis pistillum Boettger, 1895, Dalophia transvaalensis Gans, 2005, Monopeltis colobura Boulenger, 1910, Monopeltis granti Boulenger, 1907, Monopeltis granti kuanyamarum Monard, 1937, Monopeltis granti transvaalensis Fitzsimons, 1933, Monopeltis jallae Peracca, 1910, Monopeltis mossambica Cott, 1934, Tomuropeltis granti Frank & Ramus, 1995, Tomuropeltis granti colobura, Tomuropeltis granti transvaalensis, Tomuropeltis jallae, Tomuropeltis pistillum Broadley, 1962, endemic
 Genus Monopeltis:
 Monopeltis capensis A. Smith, 1848, Cape wedgesnouted worm lizard, syn. Lepidosternon capense Strauch, 1881, Monopeltis decosteri Boulenger, 1910, Monopeltis decosteri Boulenger, 1910, Monotrophis capensis Gray, 1965, near endemic
 Monopeltis capensis capensis (Smith, 1848), Cape wedgesnouted worm lizard, syn. Monopeltis capensis Gray, 1865, Lepidosternon capense Strauch 1881, Monopeltis decosteri Boulenger 1910	
 Monopeltis  capensis gazei Fitzsimons, 1937, Cape wedgesnouted worm lizard, syn. Lepidosternon capense Strauch, 1881	
 Monopeltis decosteri Boulenger, 1910, De Coster's worm lizard, syn. Monopeltis sphenorhynchus Peters 1879, Monopeltis capensis Smith, 1848, Monopeltis capensis Broadley 1971, Monopeltis sphenorhynchus Broadley 1962, endemic to southern Africa
 Monopeltis leonhardi Werner, 1910, Kalahari worm lizard, syn. Monopeltis vernayi Fitzsimons, 1932, endemic to southern Africa
 Monopeltis infuscata Broadley, 1997, infuscate wedge-snouted amphisbaenian, syn. Monopeltis sphenorhynchus Peters, 1879, Monopeltis capensis capensis Loveridge, 1941, Monopeltis capensis Peters, 1867, endemic to southern Africa
 Monopeltis mauricei sphenorhynchus Parker, 1935, Maurice's worm lizard, syn. Monopeltis mauricei Parker 1935, Monopeltis ocularis Fitzsimons 1941	
 Monopeltis sphenorhynchus Peters, 1879, slender worm lizard, syn. Lepidosternon sphenorhynchum Gray, 1865, Monopeltis capensis gazei Fitsimmons, 1937, Monopeltis habenichti Fitsimmons, 1937, endemic to southern Africa
 Monopeltis sphenorhynchus mauricei Parker, 1935, syn. Monopeltis habenichti Fitzsimons, 1937, Monopeltis mauricei Parker 1935, Monopeltis ocularis Fitzsimmons, 1941	
 Monopeltis sphenorhynchus sphenorhynchus Peters, 1879, syn. Monopeltis sphenorhynchus Peters, 1879	
 Genus Zygaspis:
 Zygaspis quadrifrons (Peters, 1862), Kalahari round-snouted worm lizard, syn. Zygaspis quadrifrons quadrifrons Peters, 1862, Amphisbaena capensis Thominot, 1887, Amphisbaena dolichomenta dolichomenta Witte & Laurent, 1942, Amphisbaena dolichomenta meridionalis Witte & Laurent, 1942, Amphisbaena quadrifrons Laurent, 1947, Amphisbaena quadrifrons capensis Loveridge, 1941, Amphisbaena quadrifrons katangae Witte & Laurent, 1942, Amphisbaena violacea Peters, 1854, Shrevea quadrifrons Vanzolini, 1951, Zygaspis arenicola Gans, 2005, Zygaspis dolichomenta Broadley & Broadley, 1997, Zygaspis vandami Gans, 2005, Zygaspis vandami arenicola Broadley & Broadley, 1997, Zygaspis vandami vandami Broadley & Broadley, 1997, Zygaspis violacea Wever & Gans, 1973, Zygaspis violacea vandami Loveridge, 1951, Zygaspis violacea vandami Welch, 1982, Amphisbaena ambuellensis Monard, 1931
 Zygaspis quadrifrons capensis (Thominot, 1887), Kalahari round-snouted worm lizard, syn. Amphisbaena ambuellensis Monard, 1931, Amphisbaena capensis Thominot, 1887, Amphisbaena quadrifrons capensis Loveridge, 1941, Shrevea quadrifrons Vanzolili 1951
 Zygaspis quadrifrons dolichomenta (Witte & Laurent, 1942), Kalahari round-snouted worm lizard, syn. Amphisbaena quadrifrons Peters, 1862, Amphisbaena dolichomenta dolichomenta Witte & Laurent, 1942, Amphisbaena dolichomenta meridionalis Witte & Laurent, 1942, Zygaspis dolichomenta Broadley & Broadley, 1997, Amphisbaena quadrifrons capensis Loveridge, 1941	
 Zygaspis quadrifrons quadrifrons (Peters, 1862), Kalahari round-snouted worm lizard, syn. Amphisbaena quadrifrons Peters, 1862 	
 Zygaspis vandami (Fitzsimons, 1930), syn. Amphisbaena vandami Fitzsimons, 1930, Zygaspis violacea vandami Fitzsimons, 1943, endemic to southern Africa
 Zygaspis vandami arenicola Broadley & Broadley, 1997' Maputoland dwarf worm lizard. syn. Zygaspis violacea vandami Fitzsimons, 1943, Amphisbaena violacea Peters, 1854, Zygaspis violacea Wever, 1973	
 Zygaspis vandami vandami (Fitzsimons, 1930), Van Dam's dwarf worm lizard, syn. Amphisbaena vandami Fitzsimons, 1930

Atractaspididae 
Family Atractaspididae
 Genus Amblyodipsas:
 Amblyodipsas concolor   (A. Smith, 1849), Natal purple-glossed snake, syn. Choristodon (Choristocalamus) concolor Smith, 1849, Calamelaps concolor Boulenger, 1896	endemic
 Amblyodipsas microphthalma   Bianconi, 1852, eyeless purple-glossed snake, syn. Calamaria microphthalma Bianconi, 1852
 Amblyodipsas microphthalma microphthalma (Bianconi, 1850), eastern purple-glossed snake, syn. Calamaria microphthalma Biancon, 1852	
 Amblyodipsas microphthalma nigra Jacobsen, 1986, black white-lipped snake, Soutpansberg purple-glossed snake, endemic
 Amblyodipsas polylepis   Bocage, 1873, common purple-glossed snake, syn. Calamelaps polylepis Bocage, 1873, Atractaspis polylepis, Calamelaps unicolor Fitzsimons, 1992 
 Amblyodipsas polylepis hildebrandtii (Peter, 1877), common purple-glossed snake	Amblyodipsas polylepis Welch, 1994, Atractaspis hildebrandtii Peters, 1877, Atractaspis polylepis Bauer, 1995, Calamelaps unicolor unicolor Loveridge, 1957 	
 Amblyodipsas  polylepis  polylepis Bocage, 1873, common purple-glossed snake, syn. Calamelaps unicolor Fitzsimons, 1992, Calamelaps unicolor unicolor Loveridge, 1957, Calamelaps miolepis Günther, 1888 	
 Genus Aparallactus:
 Aparallactus capensis (A. Smith, 1849), Cape centipede eater, syn. Aparallactus lübberti Sternfeld, 1910, Uriechis capensis Günther, 1888
 Aparallactus capensis bocagei Boulenger, 1895, Cape centipede eater, syn. Elapomorphus capensis Smith, 1849, Aparallactus bocagii Boulenger, 1895	
 Aparallactus capensis capensis Smith, 1849, Cape centipede eater, syn. Uriechis capensis Günther, 1888	
 Aparallactus capensis luebberti Sternfeld, 1910, Cape centipede eater, syn. Aparallactus capensis Boulenger, 1895	
 Aparallactus capensis punctatolineatus Boulenger, 1895, Cape centipede eater, syn. Aparallactus capensis Sternfeld, 1910, Aparallactus punctatolineatus Boulenger, 1895 	
 Aparallactus lunulatus Peters, 1854, reticulated centipede eater, syn. Uriechis lunulatus Peters, 1854, Aparallactus concolor Boulenger, 1895, Aparallactus concolor boulengeri Scortecci, 1931, Uriechis concolor Fischer, 1884 	
 Aparallactus lunulatus lunulatus (Peters, 1854), reticulated centipede eater, syn. Uriechis concolor
 Aparallactus lunulatus  nigrocollaris Chabanaud, 1916, reticulated centipede eater, syn. Uriechis lunulatus Peters, 1854, Aparallactus nigrocollaris Chabanaud, 1916	
 Aparallactus lunulatus scortecci Parker, 1949, reticulated centipede eater, syn. Uriechis concolor 
 Genus Atractaspis:
 Atractaspis bibronii A. Smith, 1849, Bibron's burrowing asp, syn. Atractaspis irregularis bibronii Boettger, 1887, Atractaspis katangae Boulenger, 1910, Atractaspis coarti Boulenger, 1910, Atractaspis irregularis Boettger, 1887, Atractaspis rostrata Günther, 1868 
 Atractaspis  bibroni  bibroni Smith, 1849, southern burrowing asp, syn. Atractaspis inornatus Smith, 1849	
 Atractaspis  bibroni  rostrata Günther, 1868, southern burrowing asp, syn. Atractaspis bibronii Smith, 1849, Atractaspis rostrata Günther, 1868	
 Atractaspis duerdeni Gough 1907, beaked burrowing asp, syn. Atractaspis duerdeni Gough, 1907	
 Genus Macrelaps:
 Macrelaps microlepidotus (Günther, 1860), syn. Atractaspis natalensis Peters, 1877, Uriechis microlepidotus Günther, 1860, endemic
 Genus Xenocalamus:
 Xenocalamus bicolor   Günther, 1868, slender quill-snouted snake
 Xenocalamus bicolor (Werne, 1915), slender quill-snouted snake
 Xenocalamus  bicolor  australis Fitzsimons, 1946, Waterberg quill-snouted snake, syn. Xenocalamus bicolor Günther, 1868, endemic
 Xenocalamus bicolor bicolor Günther, 1868, bicoloured quill-snouted snake, syn. Xenocalamus bicolor Auerbach, 1987	endemic
 Xenocalamus bicolor concavorostralis Hoffman, 1940, slender quill-snouted snake, syn. Xenocalamus bicolor Günther, 1868	
 Xenocalamus bicolor lineatus Roux, 1907, slender quill-snouted snake, syn. Xenocalamus bicolor bicolor Günther, 1868	
 Xenocalamus bicolor machadoi Laurent, 1954, slender quill-snouted snake, syn. Xenocalamus bicolor pernasutus (Werner, 1915)	
 Xenocalamus bicolor maculatus Fitzsimons, 1937, slender quill-snouted snake, syn. Michaela pernasuta Werner, 1915	
 Xenocalamus lineatus  Roux, 1907, striped quill-snouted snake  	 	
 Xenocalamus sabiensis Broadley, 1971, Sabi quill-snouted snake, endemic to southern Africa
 Xenocalamus transvaalensis Methuen, 1919, Transvaal quill-snouted snake, near endemic

Chamaelionidae  
Family Chamaeleonidae 
 Genus Bradypodion:
 Bradypodion dracomontanum Raw, 1976, Drakensberg dwarf chameleon, endemic 
 Bradypodion gutturale Smith, 1849, Robertson dwarf chameleon, syn. Chamaeleo gutturalis Smith, 1849, Chamaeleon gutturalis Werner, 1911, Chamaeleo pumilus gutturalis Hillenius, 1959, Bradypodion ventrale gutturale Branch, 1998, Bradypodion pumilum gutturale Klaver, 1997, endemic 
 Bradypodion kentanicum (Hewitt, 1935), Kentani dwarf chameleon, syn. Lophosaura melanocephala Hewitt, 1935, endemic 
 Bradypodion melanocephalum Gary, 1865, black-headed dwarf chameleon, syn. Microsaura melanocephala Gray, 1865, Chamaeleon melanocephalus Werner, 1911, Chamaeleo pumilus melanocephalus Hillenius, 1959, Bradypodion pumilum melanocephalum Böhme & Klaver, 1997, Bradypodion kentanicum Stuartfox, 2007, Lophosaura melanocephala kentamica Mertens, 1966, Lophosaura melanocephala kentanica Hewitt, 1935, endemic 
 Bradypodion pumilum ventrale (Gray, 1845), Cape dwarf chameleon, syn. Chamaeleo pumilus Mertens, 1966 
 Bradypodion pumilum caffer (Boettger, 1889), Cape dwarf chameleon, syn. Chamaeleo thermophilus Gravenhorst, 1807 
 Bradypodion pumilum occidentale (Hewitt, 1935), Cape dwarf chameleon, syn. Chamaeleon punilus Angel, 1929 
 Bradypodion pumilum pumilum (Gmelin, 1789), Cape dwarf chameleon, syn. Lacerta pumila Gmelin in Linnaeus, 1789, Chameleo pumillus pumillus Hillenius, 1959, Bradypodion pumilum pumilum Klaver & Böhme, 1997, Chamaeleo margaritaceus Merrem, 1820 
 Bradypodion pumilum taeniabronchum (A. Smith, 1831), Cape dwarf chameleon, syn. Chamaeleo pusillus var. ? Gray, 1865, endemic 
 Bradypodion transvaalense Fitzsimons, 1930, Wolkberg dwarf chameleon, syn. Chamaeleon trasvaalensis Fitzsimons, 1930, Chamaeleo natalensis Poeppig, 1866, Microsauria pumila transvaalensis (Boycott, 1992), endemic 
 Bradypodion atromontanum Branch, Tolley & Tilbury, 2006, Swartberg dwarf chameleon, endemic 
 Bradypodion caeruleogula Raw & Brothers, 2008, Eshowe dwarf chameleon, Umlazi dwarf chameleon, endemic 
 Bradypodion caffrum (Boettger, 1889), Transkei dwarf chameleon, syn. Bradypodion caffrum Boettger, 1889, Bradypodion pumilum caffer Klaver, 1997, Chamaeleo pumilus caffer Hillenius, 1959, Chamaeleon caffer Boettger, 1889, endemic 
 Bradypodion damaranum (Boulenegr, 1887), Knysna dwarf chameleon, syn. Chamaeleon damaranus Boulenger, 1887, Chamaeleo pumilus damaranus Hillenius, 1959, Chamaeleo pumilus damaranus Mertens, 1966, Bradypodion damaranums Raw, 1976, Bradypodion pumilum damaranum Klaver & Böhme, 1997, Bradypodion damaranums Necas, 1999, endemic 
 Bradypodion nemorale Raw, 1978, Zululand dwarf chameleon, syn. Bradypodion caeruleogula Raw & Brothers, 2008, endemic 
 Bradypodion ngomeense Tilbury & Tolley, 2009, Ngome dwarf chameleon, endemic 
 Bradypodion occidentale Hewitt, 1935, Namaqua dwarf chameleon, syn. Lophosaura ventralis occidentalis Hewitt, 1935, Lophosaura ventralis Brock, 1941, endemic 
 Bradypodion pumilum (Gmelin, 1789), Cape dwarf chameleon, syn. Chamaeleo margaritaceus Merrem, 1820, Chamaeleo pumilus Duméril, 1836, Chamaeleo pusillus Gray, 1865, Chamaeleo thermophilus Gravenhorst, 1807, Chamaeleon bonae spei Laurenti, 1768, Chamaeleon punilus Angel, 1929, Chameleo pumillus Gray, 1831, Lacerta pumila Gmelin, 1789, Lophosaura pumila Gray, 1865, Lophosaura pumila fordii Gray, 1865 
 Bradypodion pumilum gutturale (Smith, 1849), Cape dwarf chameleon Chamaeleo pumilus Duméril & Bibron, 1836 
 Bradypodion pumilum karrooicum (Methuen & Hewitt, 1915), Cape dwarf chameleon Lophosaura pumila var. fordii Gray, 1865 
 Bradypodion pumilum damaranum (Boulenger, 1887), Cape dwarf chameleon, syn. Chamaeleo pumillus Gray, 1831 
 Bradypodion pumilum melanocephalum (Gray, 1865), Cape dwarf chameleon, syn. Lophosaura pumila Gray, 1865 
 Bradypodion pumilum transvaalense (Fitzsimons, 1930), Cape dwarf chameleon, syn. Microsaura pumila Engelbrecht, 1951 
 Bradypodion rawi, endemic 
 Bradypodion setaroi Raw, 1976 Setaro's dwarf chameleon, syn. Chamaeleo pumilus setaroi Hofman, Maxson & Arnyzen, 1991, endemic 
 Bradypodion taeniabronchum Smith, 1831 Smith's dwarf chameleon, syn. Chaemelio taeniabronchus Smith, 1831, endemic 
 Bradypodion thamnobates Raw, 1976 Natal Midlands dwarf chameleon, endemic 
 Bradypodion ventrale Gray, 1845 Southern dwarf chameleon, syn. Chamaeleo ventralis Gray, 1845, endemic 
 Genus Chamaeleo:
 Chamaeleo dilepis Leach, 1819, flapneck chameleon, syn. Chamaeleo angusticoronatus Barbour, 1903, Chamaeleo bilobus Kuhl, 1820, Chamaeleo capellii Bocage, 1866, Chamaeleo dilepas Martin, 1838, Chamaeleo petersii kirkii Gray, 1865, Chamaeleo planiceps Merrem, 1820, Chamaeleo (Chamaeleo) dilepis Necas, 1999, Chamaeleon dilepis Gray, 1865 
 Chamaeleo dilepis idjwiensis Loveridge, 1942, flapneck chameleon, syn. Chamaeleo peterkirkii Gray, 1865 
 Chamaeleo dilepis isabellinus Günther, 1893, flapneck chameleon, syn. Chamaeleo capellii Bocage, 1866 
 Chamaeleo dilepis petersii Gray, 1865, flapneck chameleon, syn. Chamaeleo bilobus Kuhl, 1820 
 Chamaeleo dilepis quilensis Bocage, 1866, Bocage's chameleon, syn. Chamaeleo quilensis Bocage, 1866, Chamaeleon parvilobus Boulenger, 1887,  Chamaeleo (Chamaeleo) quilensis Necas, 1999 
 Chamaeleo namaquensis Smith, 1831, Namaqua chameleon, syn. Chamaeleo capensis Bonnaterre, 1789, Chaemelio namaquensis Smith, 1831, Chamaeleo tuberculiferus Gray, 1845, Phumanola namaquensis Gray, 1865, Chamaeleon namaquensis Werner, 1911, Chamaeleo (Chamaeleo) namaquensis Klaver & Böhme, 1986, endemic to southwestern parts of Africa
 Genus Rhampholeon:
 Rhampholeon gorongosae Broadley, 1971 Rhampholeon marshalli gorongosae, endemic

Colubridae 
Family Colubridae
 Genus Amplorhinus:
 Amplorhinus multimaculatus   A. Smith, 1847	many-spotted snake, syn. Dipsas smithii Duméril & Bibron, 1854, Coronella multimaculatus Günther, 1858, Psammophylax multimaculatus Jan, 1863, near endemic
 Genus Crotaphopeltis:
 Crotaphopeltis hotamboeia  (Laurenti, 1768), red-lipped herald, syn. Coronella hotamboeia Laurenti, 1768, Coronella rufescens Schlegel, 1837, Crotaphopeltis bicolor (Leach, 1819), Crotaphopeltis hotamboeia hotamboeia Loveridge, 1937, Crotaphopeltis rufescens Bocage, 1866, Dipsas inornatus Smith, 1849, Heterurus rufescens Duméril & Bibron, 1854, Leptodira hotamboeia Peracca, 1897, Leptodira hitamboeia Boulenger, 1897, Leptodeira hotamboeia  Schmidt, 1923, Leptodira rufescens Boettger, 1893, Tarbophis barnum-browni Bogert, 1940, Dipsas inornatus Smith, 1849, Crotaphopeltis hotamboeia ruziziensis Laurent, 1956, Crotaphopeltis hotamboeia Broadley, 1968, Crotaphopeltis bicolor (Leach, 1819)
 Genus Dasypeltis:
 Dasypeltis inornata A. Smith, 1849, southern brown egg eater, syn. Rachiodon inornatus Duméril, Bibron & Duméril, 1854, Dasypeltis inornatus Smith, 1849, Dasypeltis inornata Boycott, 1992, endemic
 Dasypeltis medici medici (Bianconi, 1859), East African egg-eater
 Dasypeltis scabra (Linnaeus, 1758), common egg-eater, syn. Coluber scaber Linnaeus, 1758, Anodon typus Smith, 1828, Dasypeltis lineolata Peters, 1878, Dasypeltis palmarum Trape & Roux-Estéve, 1992, Dasypeltis scaber breviceps Peters, 1864, Dasypeltis scaber capensis Peters, 1864, Dasypeltis scaber mossambicus Peters, 1864, Dasypeltis scabra palmarum Werner, 1884, Tropidonotus scaber Schlegel, 1837, Dasypeltis scabra Wagler, 1830, Rachiodon scaber Duméril, Bibron & Duméril 1854, Rachiodon scaber Bocage, 1866
 Dasypeltis scabra loveridgei Mertens, 1954, common egg-eater, syn. Dasypeltis scabra Wagler, 1830
 Dasypeltis scabra scabra Linnaeus, 1758, common egg-eater, syn. Dasypeltis palmarum Leach, 1818
 Genus Dipsadoboa:
 Dipsadoboa aulica (Günther, 1864), marbled tree snake, syn. Chamaetortus aulicus Günther, 1864,  Chamaetortus aulicus aulicus Broadley, 1962, Dipsadoboa aulica Rasmussen, 1989, Dipsadoboa aulica aulica Boycott, 1992, Dipsadoboa aulica Broadley & Howell, 1991, Dipsadoboa aulica Mattison, 2007
 Genus Dipsina:
 Dipsina multimaculata (A. Smith, 1847), dwarf beaked snake, syn. Coronella multimaculata Smith, 1847, Rhamphiophis multimaculatus Sternfeld, 1910, endemic to southern Africa
 Genus Dispholidus:
 Dispholidus typus (A. Smith, 1828), boomslang, syn. Bucephalus typus Smith, 1828, Bucephalus capensis Smith, 1841, Bucephalus viridis Smith, 1828, Bucephalus bellii Smith, 1828, Bucephalus gutturalis Smith, 1828, Bucephalus jardineii Smith, 1828, Bucephalus typus Duméril & Bibron, 1854, Bucephalus capensis Günther, 1888, Dispholidus typus typus Auerbach, 1987, endemic to sub-Saharan Africa
 Dispholidus typus typus (Smith, 1829), boomslang
 Dispholidus typus kivuensis Laurent, 1955, boomslang
 Dispholidus typus punctatus Laurent, 1955, boomslang
 Genus Duberria:
 Duberria lutrix Linnaeus, 1758, common slug eater, syn. Coluber lutrix Linnaeus, 1758, Homalosoma lutrix Duméril & Bibron, 1854, Homalosoma abyssinicum Boulenger, 1894, Duberria lutrix lutrix Boycott, 1992, Duberria lutrix atriventris (Sternfeld, 1912), Homalosoma lutrix atriventris Sternfeld, 1912, Duberria lutrix atriventris Broadley & Howell, 1991, Duberria lutrix basilewskyi Skelton-Bourgeios, 1961, Duberria lutrix rhodesiana Broadley, 1958,Duberria lutrix shirana (Boulenger, 1894), Homalosoma shiranum Boulenger, 1894, Duberria shirana Broadley et al. 2004
 Duberria lutrix lutrix (Linnaeus, 1758), common slug eater, Duberria lutrix Linnaeus, 1758, endemic
 Duberria lutrix abyssinica (Boulenger, 1849), common slug eater, syn. Homalosoma lutrix Duméril & Bibron, 1854
 Duberria lutrix atriventris (Sternfeld, 1912), common slug eater, syn. Homalosoma abyssinicum Boulenger, 1894
 Duberria lutrix basilewskyi Skelton-Bourgeois, 1961, common slug eater, Duberria lutrix lutrix (Linnaeus, 1758)	
 Duberria lutrix currylindahli  Laurent, 1956, common slug eater, syn. Duberria lutrix Linnaeus, 1758
 Duberria lutrix rhodesiana Broadley, 1958, Zimbabwean slug eater, syn. Duberria lutrix atriventris (Sternfeld, 1912)
 Duberria  lutrix  shirana (Boulenger, 1894)	common slug eater, syn. Homalosoma lutrix var. atriventris Sternfeld, 1912, Duberria lutrix shiranum Loveridge, 1936, Duberria shirana Broadley et al., 2004, Homalosoma shiranum Boulenger, 1894 	
 Duberria variegata (Peters, 1854), variegated slug eater, syn. Homalosoma variegatum Peters, 1854, Duberria variegata Bauer et al., 1995, endemic
 Genus Gonionotophis:
 Gonionotophis nyassae Günther, 1888, black file snake, syn. Simocephalus nyassae Günther, 1888, Gonionotophis degrijsi Werner, 1906
 Gonionotophis capensis   Smith, 1847, Cape file snake, syn. Heterolepis capensis Smith, 1847, Heterolepis capensis Smith, 1847, Mehelia (Simocephalus) fiechteri Scortecci, 1929, Mehelya chanleri chanleri Loveridge, 1936, Mehelya grayi Petzold, 1975, Mehelya lamani Lönnberg, 1910, Mehelya poensis Testi, 1935, Mehelya somaliensis Lönnberg & Andersson, 1913, Simocephalus butleri Boulenger, 1907,  Simocephalus capensis Boulenger, 1893, Simocephalus phyllopholis Werner, 1901, Simocephalus unicolor Boulenger, 1910, Heterolepis gueinzii Peters, 1874	
 Gonionotophis capensis capensis  (Smith, 1847)	Cape file snake, syn. Heterolepis gueinzii Peters, 1874, Heterolepis capensis Smith, 1847
 Gonionotophis capensis savorgnani  (Mosquard, 1887), Cape file snake, syn. Heterolepis capensis Smith, 1847, Heterolepis savorgnani Mocquard, 1887, Mehelya savorgnani,, Pauwels, 2006, Mehelya lamani Schmidt, 1923 
 Gonionotophis capensis  unicolor (Boulenger, 1910), Cape file snake, syn. Heterolepis chanleri Stejneger, 1893, Simocephalus unicolor Boulenger, 1910
 Genus Hemirhagerrhis:
 Hemirhagerrhis nototaenia (Günther, 1864), eastern bark snake, syn. Amphiophis nototaenia Boulenger, 1891, Amplorhinus güntheri Mocquard, 1906, Amplorhinus nototaenia Boulenger, 1896,  Coronella nototaenia Günther, 1864, Hemirhagerrhis nototaenia nototaenia Bogert, 1940, Psammophylax nototaenia Bocage, 1895, Tachymenis nototaenia Peters, 1882, endemic to sub-Saharan Africa
 Hemirhagerrhis viperinus Bocage, 1893, western bark snake, syn. Psammophylax viperinus Bocage, 1873, Psammophylax nototaenia Bocage, 1895, Amplorhinus nototaenia Boulenger, 1896, Hemirhagerrhis nototaenia viperinus Bogert, 1940, Hemirhagerrhis nototaenia viperina Mertens, 1955
 Genus Homoroselaps:
 Homoroselaps dorsalis (A. Smith, 1849), striped harlequin snake, syn. Elaps dorslais [sic] Smith, 1849, Poecilophis dorsalis Günther, 1859, endemic
 Homoroselaps lacteus  (Linnaeus, 1758), spotted harlequin snake, syn. Coluber lacteus Linnaeus, 1758, Elaps lacteus Schneider, 1801, Elaps punctatus Smith, 1826, Elaps hygiae Duméril & Bibron, 1854, Homoroselaps lacteus Welch, 1994, endemic
 Genus Inyoka:
 Inyoka swazicus (Schaefer, 1970), Swazi rock snake, endemic
 Genus Lamprophis:
 Lamprophis aurora (Linnaeus, 1758), aurora house snake, night snake, syn. Coluber aurora Linnaeus, 1758, Coronella aurora Schlegel, 1837, Lycodon aurora Boie, 1827, Natrix aurora Merrem, 1820, endemic
 Lamprophis capensis (Duméril & Bibron, 1854), brown house snake, syn. Lamprophis fuliginosus Boie, 1827,  Boaedon capense Duméril & Bibron, 1854	
 Lamprophis fuliginosus   Boie, 1827, African house snake, syn. Lycodon fuliginosus Boie, 1827,  Boaedon fuliginosum Håkansson, 1981,  Boaedon fuliginosus Schmidt, 1923,  Boaedon quadrilineatum Peters, 1882,  Boodon bipraeocularis Günther, 1888,  Boodon fuliginosus Boulenger, 1893,  Lamprophis arabicus (Parker, 1988),  Lamprophis fuliginosus bedriagae Chippaux, 1999,  Boaedon fuliginosus fuliginosus Rasmussen, 1981,  Boaedon unicolor Duméril, 1854	
 Lamprophis fuliginosus fuliginosus (Boie, 1827), brown house snake, syn. Boaedon unicolor Duméril (in Duméril, Bibron & Duméril), 1854, Boaedon fuliginosus fuliginosus Rasmussen, 1981
 Lamprophis fuliginosus mentalis Günther, 1888, brown house snake, syn. Boaedon quadrilineatum Jan (in Jan & Sordelli), 1870, Boodon mentalis Günther, 1888, Lamprophis fuliginosus bedriagae Chippaux, 1999
 Lamprophis fuscus Boulenger, 1893, yellow-bellied house snake, syn. Lamprophis longicauda Werner, 1909, endemic
 Lamprophis guttatus Smith, 1843, spotted house snake, syn. Alopecion annulifer Duméril & Bibron, 1854, Boaedon guttatus Loveridge, 1936, Boodon guttatus Boulenger, 1891, Lycodon guttatus Smith, 1843, near endemic
 Lamprophis inornatus (Duméril, Bibron & Duméril, 1854), olive house snake, syn. Boodon infernalis Günther, 1858, Pachyophis temporalis Werner, 1924, endemic
 Lamprophis fiskii Boulenger, 1887, Fisk's house snake, syn. Lamprophis fiski Boulenger, 1887, endemic
 Genus Limnophis:
 Limnophis bangweolicus Broadley, 1991, bicolored swamp snake, syn. Limnophis bicolor Günther, 1865	
 Genus Lycodonomorphus:
 Lycodonomorphus laevissimus (Günther, 1862), dusky-bellied water snake, syn. Natrix laevissima Günther, 1862, Neusterophis laevissima Günther, 1863, Tropidonotus laevissimus Boulenger, 1893, endemic
 Lycodonomorphus laevissimus fitzsimonsi Raw, 1973, dusky-bellied water snake, endemic
 Lycodonomorphus laevissimus natalensis Raw, 1973, dusky-bellied water snake, syn. Tropidonotus laevissimus Boulenger, 1893, endemic
 Lycodonomorphus laevissimus laevissimus Günther, 1862, dusky-bellied water snake, syn. Neusterophis laevissima Günther, 1863, endemic
 Lycodonomorphus obscuriventris fitzsimonsi, 1964, floodplain water snake, syn. Lycodonomorphus obscuriventris Broadley, 1995, endemic to southern Africa
 Lycodonomorphus rufulus (Lichtenstein, 1823), common brown water snake, syn. Ablabes rufula Duméril, 1854, Ablabophis rufulus Boulenger, 1893, Coluber rufulus Fitzinger, 1826, Coronella rufula Lichtenstein, 1823, Lamprophis rufulus Smith, 1849, endemic to southern Africa
 Lycodonomorphus whytii (Boulenger, 1897), Whyte's water snake, syn. Lycodonomorphus obscuriventris Broadley, 1995
 Genus Lycophidion:
 Lycophidion acutirostre (Günther, 1868), Mozambique wolf snake	
 Lycophidion capense Smith, 1831, Cape wolf snake, syn. Lydodon capensis Smith, 1831,  Lycophidion horstockii Bocage, 1866,  Lycophidion semicinctum Scortecci, 1931,  Lycophidium horstokii Fischer, 1884,  Lycophidium capense Boulnger, 1893 
 Lycophidion capense capense (Smith, 1831), Cape wolf snake, syn. Lycophidion capense Boulenger, 1893
 Lycophidion capense pembanum Laurent, 1968, Cape wolf snake, syn. Lycophidion jacksoni Boulenger, 1893
 Lycophidion capense jacksoni Boulenger, 1893, Cape wolf snake, syn. Lycophidium capense Boulenger, 1893, Lycophidion irroratum Schmidt, 1923,  Lycophidium abyssinicum Boulenger, 1893
 Lycophidion capense loveridgei Laurent, 1968, Cape wolf snake, syn. Lycophidium abyssinicum Boulenger, 1893,  Lycophidion semicinctum Scortecci 1931
 Lycophidion capense multimaculatum Boettger, 1888, Cape wolf snake, syn. Lycophidion capense jacksoni Boulenger, 1893, Lycophidion multimaculatum Broadley, 1991
 Lycophidion capense vermiculatum Laurent, 1968, Cape wolf snake, syn. Lycophidion irroratum Schmidt, 1923
 Lycophidion multimaculatum  Broadley, 1992, syn. Lycophidion capense multimaculatum Boettger, 1888, Lycophidion capense mut Boettger, 1888, endemic
 Lycophidion pygmaeum Broadley, 1996, pygmy wolf snake, syn. Lycophidion pygmaeum, endemic
 Lycophidion semiannule Peters, 1854	Eastern wolf snake, syn. Lycophidion semiannulis Peters, 1854, Lycophidion acutirostre (Günther, 1868)
 Lycophidion variegatum Broadley, 1969, variegated wolf snake, syn. Lycophidion variegatum, endemic to southern Africa
 Genus Meizodon:
 Meizodon semiornatus Peters, 1854, semiornate snake, syn. Coronella semiornata Peters, 1854, Zamenis citernii Boulenger, 1912, Coronella semiornata semiornata Mertens, 1938, Coronella semiornata Loveridge, 1936, Coluber citernii Loveridge, 1957	
 Meizodon semiornatus semiornatus (Peters, 1854), semiornate snake, syn. Zamenis fischeri Peters, 1879, endemic to eastern and southeastern Africa
 Meizodon semiornatus tchadensis (Chabanaud, 1917), semiornate snake, syn. Coronella inornata Fischer, 1884, Zamenis tchadensis Chabanaud, 1917
 Genus Montaspis:
 Montaspis gilvomaculata Bourquin, 1991, cream-spotted mountain snake, endemic
 Genus Natriciteres:
 Natriciteres variegata (Peters, 1861), variable marsh snake, syn. Mizodon variegatus Peters, 1861, Tropidonotus variegatus Boulenger, 1893, Neusterophis variegatus Taylor & Weyer, 1958
 Natriciteres  variegata  variegata (Peters, 1861), variable marsh snake, syn. Mizodon variegatus Peters, 1861, Tropidonotus variegatus Boulenger, 1893, Neusterophis variegatus Taylor & Weyer, 1959
 Natriciteres olivacea (Peters, 1861), olive marsh snake, syn. Coronella olivacea Peters, 1854, Natrix olivacea (Peters, 1854), Natrix olivacea subspecies uluguruensis Loveridge, 1935, Natrix olivaceus (Peters, 1854), Neusterophis atratus Peters, 1877, Tropidonotus olivaceus (Peters, 1854)
 Natriciteres sylvatica Broadley, 1966, forest marsh snake, syn. Natriciteres variegata sylvatica Broadley, 1966	
 Genus Philothamnus:
 Philothamnus angolensis Bocage, 1882, Angola green snake, syn. Ahaetulla emini Günther,  1888, Ahaetulla shirana Günther,  1888, Chlorophis angolensis Boulenger, 1894,  Chlorophis emini Boulenger, 1894, Chlorophis shirana Günther, 1895 
 Philothamnus hoplogaster (Günther, 1863), green water snake, syn. Ahaetulla hoplogaster Günther, 1863, Chlorophis hoplogaster Boulenger, 1894, Chlorophis neglectus Peters, 1867, Chlorophis oldhami Theobald, 1868, Clorophis neglectus Boulenger, 1894, Cyclophis oldhami Theobald, 1876	
 Philothamnus irregularis Leach, 1819, northern green bush snake, syn. Coluber caeruleus Lacépède, 1789, Coluber irregularis Leach, 1819, Dendrophis chenoni Reinhardt, 1843, Leptophis chenonii Duméril et al, 1854, Philothamnus irregularis longifrenatus Buchholz & Peters, 1875, Chlorophis irregularis Boulenger, 1894
 Philothamnus natalensis Smith, 1848, Natal green snake, syn. Dendrophis (Philothamnus) natalensis Smith, 1848,  Dendrophis subcarinatus Jan, 1869, Chlorophis natalensis Boulenger, 1894, Ahaetulla natalensis Günther, 1863, Dendrophis (Philothamnus) albovariata Smith, 1848, Ahaetulla irregularis natalensis Günther, 1858, Philothamnus natalensis natalensis Boycott, 1992, Philothamnus natalensis occidentalis Broadley, 1966
 Philothamnus natalensis natalensis (A. Smith, 1840), Eastern Natal green snake, syn. Dendrophis (Philothamnus) albovariata Smith, 1848	
 Philothamnus natalensis occidentalis Broadley, 1966, Western Natal green snake, syn. Ahaetulla irregularis natalensis Günther, 1858, endemic
 Philothamnus semivariegatus (A. Smith, 1847), spotted bush snake, syn. Dendrophis (Philothamnus) semivariegata Smith, 1840, Ahaetulla bocagii Günther, 1888, Ahaetulla irregularis Parenti & Picaglia, 1886, Chrysopelea capensis Smith, 1837,  Philothamnus bocagii Günther, 1895, Philothamnus semivariegatus semivariegatus Loveridge, 1936, Philothamnus semivariegatus semivariegatus Loveridge, 1936' endemic to sub-Saharan Africa
 Genus Prosymna:
 Prosymna bivittata Werner, 1903, two-striped shovel-snout, syn. Prosymna sundevalli bivittata Werner, 1903, endemic
 Prosymna frontalis Peters, 1867, south-western shovel-snout, syn. Temnorhynchus frontalis Peters, 1867, Prosymna bergeri Lindholm (in Lampe & Lindholm), 1902, endemic to southern Africa
 Prosymna janii Bianconi, 1862, Mozambique shovel-snout, syn. Prosymna jani Loveridge, 1862
 Prosymna lineata (Peter, 1871), lineolate shovel-snout, syn. Prosymna sundevalli lineata, endemic
 Prosymna sundevallii (A. Smith, 1849), lineolate shovel-snout, syn. Temnorhynchus sundervalli Smith, 1849, Prosymna lineata (Boycott, 1992), Prosymna sundevalli lineata (Peters 1871), Temnorhynchus lineatus Peters 1871, Prosymna sundevalli sundevalli (Smith, 1849), Temnorhynchus sundervalli Smith, 1849, near endemic
 Prosymna sundevallii lineata (Peters, 1871), lineolate shovel-snout, syn. Prosymna lineata Boycott 1992, Temnorhynchus lineatus Peters 1871	
 Prosymna sundevallii sundevalli (Smith, 1849), southern shovel-snout, syn. Temnorhynchus lineatus
 Prosymna stuhlmannii (Pfeffer, 1893), Eastern African shovel-snout
 Genus Psammophis:
 Psammophis angolensis (Bocage, 1872), dwarf sand snake, syn. Ablabes homeyeri Peters, 1870, Amphiophis angolensis Bocage, 1872, Amphiophis angolense Günther, 1888	
 Psammophis crucifer (Daudin, 1803), cross-marked grass snake, syn. Coluber crucifer Daudin, 1803, near endemic
 Psammophis jallae Peracca, 1896, Jalla's sand snake		
 Psammophis leightoni Boulenger, 1902, Cape sand snake, endemic
 Psammophis subtaeniatus Peters, 1881, stripe-bellied sand snake, syn. Psammophis bocagii Boulenger, 1895, Psammophis moniliger bilineatus Peters, 1867, Psammophis subtaeniatus subtaeniatus Auerbach, 1987, Psammophis sibilans subtaeniata Peters, 1882
 Psammophis trigrammus Günther, 1865, western sand snake, endemic to southwestern Africa
 Psammophis trinasalis Werner, 1902, fork-marked sand snake, syn. Psammophis furcatus Loveridge, 1936, Psammophis leightoni trinasalis Werner, 1902, Psammophis moniliger furcatus Peters, 1867, Psammophis sibilans trinasalis Werner, 1902, endemic to southern Africa
 Psammophis brevirostris Peters, 1881, short-snouted grass snake, syn. Coluber sibilans Linnaeus, 1758, Coluber moniliger Daudin 1803, Psammophis sibilans Boie, 1827, Psammophis sibilans Boie, 1827	, endemic to southern Africa
 Psammophis mossambicus Peters, 1882, olive grass snake, syn. Psammophis sibilans mossambica Peters 1882, Psammophis sibilans tettensis Peters, 1882, Psammophis thomasi Gough 1908
 Psammophis namibensis Broadley, 1975, Namib sand snake, syn. Psammophis leightoni namibensis Broadley 1975, Psammophis leightoni namibensis Bauer et al. 1993, Psammophis namibensis Broadley 2002, Psammophis namibensis   Bauer & Branch 2003, Psammophis namibensis Shine et al. 2006
 Psammophis notostictus  Peters, 1867, Karoo sand snake, syn. Psammophis moniliger notostictus Peters, 1867
 Genus Psammophylax:
 Psammophylax rhombeatus Linnaeus, 1758. spotted skaapsteker, syn. Coluber rhombeatus Linnaeus, 1758, Psammophylax tritaeniatus tritaeniatus, Dipsas rhombeatus Duméril & Bibron, 1854, Psammophis longementalis Roux, 1907, Psammophylax rhombeatus rhombeatus Boycott, 1992
 Psammophylax rhombeatus  rhombeatus (Bocage, 1873), striped skaapsteker, syn. Psammophylax rhombeatus Fischer, 1881
 Psammophylax tritaeniatus (Günther, 1868), striped skaapsteker, syn. Rhagerrhis tritaeniatus Günther, 1868, endemic to sub-Saharan Africa
 Psammophylax tritaeniatus fitgeraldi, striped skaapsteker, syn. Psammophylax tritaeniatus Günther, 1868	
 Psammophylax tritaeniatus subniger (Laurent, 1956), striped skaapsteker, syn. Psammophylax tritaeniatus tritaeniatus (Günther, 1868)
 Psammophylax tritaeniatus tritaeniatus (Günther, 1868), striped skaapsteker, syn. Rhagerhis tritaeniata Bocage, 1896
 Psammophylax tritaeniatus festigus (Laurent, 1956), striped skaapsteker, syn. Psammophylax tritaeniatus Günther, 1868
 Psammophylax tritaeniatus vanoyei (Laurent, 1956), striped skaapsteker, syn. Psammophylax tritaeniatus Günther, 1868
 Genus Pseudaspis:
 Pseudaspis cana (Linnaeus, 1758), mole snake, syn. Coluber canus Linnaeus, 1758, Coronella cana Duméril, Bibron & Duméril, 1854, Duberria cana Fitzinger, 1826, Pseudaspis cana Cope, 1864,  Cadnus cuneiformis Theobald (fide Fitzsimmons, 1966), Coronella phocarum Günther (fide Fitzsimmons, 1966), Ophirhina anchietae Bocage (fide Fitzsimmons, 1966)
 Genus Rhamphiophis:
 Rhamphiophis rostratus Peters, 1854, rufous beaked snake, syn. Rhamphiophis oxyrhynchus rostratus (Peters, 1854), Rhamphiophis oxyrhynchus (Reinhart, 1843), Rhamphiophis oxyrhynchus Peters, 1854, Rhagerrhis unguiculata Günther, 1868, Coelopeltis oxyrhynchus Jan, Coelopeltis porrectus Jan, Rhagerrhis oxyrhynchus Günther, 1888, endemic to sub-Saharan Africa
 Genus Telescopus:
 Telescopus beetzii (Barbour, 1922), Namib tiger snake, syn. Tarbophis beetzi Barbour, 1922. endemic to southwestern Africa
 Telescopus semiannulatus Smith, 1849	common tiger snake, syn. Leptodira semiannulata Günther, 1888,  Tarbophis semiannulatus Sternfeld, 1910,  Telescopus semiannulatus semiannulatus Boycott, 1992	
 Telescopus semiannulatus  polystictus  Mertens, 1954, Damara tiger snake, syn. Telescopus semiannulatus Duméril & Bibron, 1854 endemic to southwestern Africa
 Telescopus semiannulatus  semiannulatus A. Smith, 1849, eastern tiger snake, syn. Leptodira semiannulata Günther, 1888, endemic to southern half of Africa
 Genus Thelotornis:
 Thelotornis capensis Smith, 1849, vine snake, syn. Thelotornis capensis capensis Smith, 1849, Dryiophis kirtlandii mossambicana Bocage, 1895, Dryiophis oatesi Günther, 1881, Thelotornis capensis oatesi (Günther, 1881), Thelotornis mossambicanus Broadley, 2001, Thelotornis kirtlandi capensis Smith, 1849, Thelotornis kirtlandii oatesi Broadley, 1962, Thelotornis oatesi Haagner et al. 2000, Thelotornis capensis mossambicanus (Bocage, 1895), Thelotornis capensis mossambicanus Rasmussen, 1981
 Thelotornis capensis capensis A. Smith, 1849, twig snake, syn. Thelotornis capensis Smith, 1849, endemic to southern Africa
 Thelotornis capensis mossambicanus (Bocage, 1895), eastern vine snake, syn. Thelotornis kirtlandi capensis Smith, 1849, Dryiophis kirtlandii var. mossambicana Bocage, 1895, Thelotornis mossambicanus Broadley, 2001
 Thelotornis capensis oatesi (Günther, 1881), Oates' vine snake, syn. Thelotornis kirtlandi capensis Loveridge, 1957, Dryiophis oatesi Günther, 1881, Thelotornis capensis oatesi (Günther, 1881)
 Thelotornis capensis schilsi Derleyn, 1978, twig snake, syn. Thelotornis capensis capensis Boycott, 1992

Cordylidae 
Family Cordylidae
 Genus Chamaesaura:
 Chamaesaura aenae (Fitzsimons, 1843), Transvaal snake lizard, syn. Cricochalcis aenea Fitzinger, 1843, Chamaesaura miodactyla Günther, 1880, Cordylus aenea Frost et al., 2001, endemic
 Chamaesaura anguina Linnaeus, 1758, Cape snake lizard, syn. Chamaesaura anguina anguina (Linnaeus 1758), Chalcides monodactylus Oppel, 1811, Chamaesaura anguinea Schneider, 1801, Chamaesaura annectens Boulenger, 1899, Chamaesaura didactyla Boulenger, 1890, Chamaesaura tenuior Günther, 1895, Cordylus anguina Cooper, 2005, Cordylus anguinus Frost et al., 2001, Monodactylus anguinus Merrem, 1820, Seps monodactylus Daudin, 1802, Lacerta anguina Linnaeus, 1758, Chalcides pinnata Laurenti, 1768, Chalcides anguina Meyer, 1795, Chamaesaura anguina oligopholis Laurent, 1964, Chamaesaura annectens Boulenger, 1899, Chamaesaura anguina tenuior Loveridge, 1944	
 Chamaesaura anguina anguina (Linnaeus, 1758), Cape grass lizard, syn. Lacerta anguina Linnaeus, 1758, endemic
 Chamaesaura anguina oligopholis Laurent, 1964, Cape snake lizard, syn. Chalcides pinnata Laurenti, 1768	
 Chamaesaura anguina tenuior Günther, 1895, Cape snake lizard, syn. Chalcides anguina Meyer, 1795, Chamaesaura annectens Boulenger 1899, Chamaesaura tenuior Günther 1895 	
 Chamaesaura macrolepis   (Cope, 1862), large-scale snake lizard, syn. Chamaesaura macrolepis macrolepis (Cope, 1862), Cordylus macrolepis Frost et al., 2001, Mancus macrolepis Cope, 1862, Chamaesaura macrolepis miopropus Boulenger, 1894, Chamaesaura miopropus Boulenger, 1894, near endemic
 Chamaesaura macrolepis  macrolepis (Cope, 1862), large-scale snake lizard, syn. Mancus macrolepis Cope, 1862, Cordylus macrolepis Frost et al., 2001	
 Chamaesaura macrolepis  miopropus Boulenger, 1894, large-scale snake lizard, syn. Chamaesaura macrolepis Boulenger, 1885, Chamaesaura miopropus Boulenger, 1894
 Genus Cordylus:
 Cordylus campbelli Fitzsimons, 1938, Campbell's girdled lizard, syn. Zonurus campbelli Fitzsimons, 1938
 Cordylus cloetei Mouton & Van Wyk, 1994, Cloete's girdled lizard, endemic
 Cordylus cordylus (Linnaeus, 1758), Cape girdled lizard, syn. Lacerta cordylus Linnaeus, 1758, Cordylus verus Laurenti, 1768, Stellio cordylus Daudin, 1802, Cordylus dorsalis Cuvier, 1829, Cordylus griseus Cuvier, 1829, Zonurus vertebralis Gray, 1838, Zonurus cordylus Gray, 1838, endemic
 Cordylus imkae Mouton & Van Wyk, 1994, Rooiberg girdled lizard, syn. Cordylus imkeae, endemic
 Cordylus jonesii  (Boulenger, 1891)	Jones' girdled lizard, syn. Zonurus jonesii Boulenger, 1891, Zonurus cordylus jonesii Power, 1930, Cordylus cordylus jonesii Loveridge, 1944, Cordylus tropidosternum jonesii Auerbach, 1987, endemic
 Cordylus macropholis (Boulenger, 1910), coastal spinytail lizard, syn. Zonurus macropholis Boulenger, 1910, endemic
 Cordylus mclachlani (Mouton, 1986), McLachlan's girdled lizard, endemic
 Cordylus minor Fitzsimons, 1943, western dwarf girdled lizard, syn. Cordylus cordylus minor Fitzsimons, 1943, endemic
 Cordylus namaquensis   Methuen & Hewitt, 1914, Namaqua girdled lizard, syn. Zonurus namaquensis Methuen & Hewitt, 1914	
 Cordylus niger Cuvier, 1829, black girdled lizard, syn. Calyptoprymnus verecundus De Vis, 1905, Zonurus cordylus niger Rose, 1926, Zonurus cordylus atrus Power, 1930, Cordylus cordylus niger Loveridge, 1944, endemic
 Cordylus oelofseni Mouton & Van Wyk, 1990, Oelofsen's girdled lizard, endemic
 Cordylus tasmani Power, 1930	Tasman's girdled lizard, syn. Zonurus cordylus tasmani Power, 1930, Cordylus cordylus tasmani Fitzsimons, 1943, endemic
 Cordylus vittifer (Reichenow, 1887), Transvaal girdled lizard, syn. Cordylus vittifer vittifer (Reichenow, 1887), Zonurus tropidogaster Boulenger, 1910, Zonurus vittifer Reichenow, 1887, Cordylus vittifer machadoi Laurent, 1964 Near, endemic
 Cordylus vittifer machadoi Laurent, 1964, Machado’s girdled lizard, syn. Zonurus cordylus var. vittifer Roux, 1907, Cordylus machadoi Branch, 1998	
 Cordylus vittifer vittifer (Reichenow, 1887), Transvaal girdled lizard, syn. Zonurus vittifer Reichenow, 1887	
 Cordylus warreni   Boulenger, 1908	Warren's spinytail lizard, syn. Cordylus barbertonensis, Cordylus breyeri Branch, 1998, Cordylus depressus, Cordylus laevigatus Fitzsimons, 1943, Cordylus mossambicus Branch, 1998, Cordylus regius Branch, 1998, Cordylus vandami Branch, 1998 , Cordylus vandami vandami Fitzsimons, 1943, Cordylus warreni barbertonensis (Van Dam, 1921), Cordylus warreni breyeri (Van Dam, 1921), Cordylus warreni depressus (Fitzsimons, 1930), Cordylus warreni laevigatus (Fitzsimons, 1933), Cordylus warreni mossambicus Fitzsimons, 1958, Cordylus warreni perkoensis (Fitzsimons, 1930), Cordylus warreni regius Broadley, 1962, Cordylus warreni vandami (Fitzsimons, 1930), Cordylus warreni warreni (Boulenger, 1908), Zonurus barbertonensis depressus Fitzsimons, 1930, Zonurus barbertonensis Van Dam, 1921, Zonurus breyeri Van Dam, 1921, Zonurus laevigatus Fitzsimons, 1933, Zonurus vandami Fitzsimons, 1930, Zonurus vandami perkoensis Fitzsimons, 1930, Zonurus warreni Boulenger, 1908	
 Cordylus warreni laevigatus (Fitzsimons, 1933), Warren's girdled lizard, syn. Zonurus barbertonensis Van Dam, 1921, Cordylus laevigatus Fitzsimons, 1943, Zonurus laevigatus Fitzsimons, 1933	
 Cordylus warreni mossambicus Fitzsimons, 1958, Gorongosa girdled lizard, syn. Cordylus warreni barbertonensis Fitzsimons, 1943, Cordylus mossambicus Branch, 1998	
 Cordylus warreni perkoensis (Fitzsimons, 1930), Warren's girdled lizard, syn. Cordylus warreni barbertonensis Boycott, 1992, Zonurus vandami perkoensis Fitzsimons, 1930	
 Cordylus warreni  regius Broadley, 1962, regal girdled lizard, syn. Cordylus barbertonensis, Cordylus regius Branch, 1998	
 Cordylus warreni  vandami (Fitzsimons, 1930), Van Dam’s girdled lizard, syn. Cordylus warreni breyeni (Van Dam, 1921), Cordylus vandami Branch, 1998, Cordylus vandami vandami Fitzsimons, 1943, Zonurus vandami Fitzsimons, 1930	
 Genus Hemicordylus:
 Hemicordylus capensis (A. Smith, 1838), graceful crag lizard, syn. Cordylus capensis Smith, 1838, Cordylus (Hemicordylus) capensis Smith, 1838, Zonurus capensis Duméril & Bibron, 1839, Zonurus capensis Boulenger, 1885, Zonurus robertsi Van Dam, 1921, Cordylus capensis capensis Fitzsimons, 1943, Cordylus capensis robertsi Fitzsimons, 1943, Pseudocordylus robertsi Loveridge, 1944, endemic
 Hemicordylus nebulosus (Mouton & Van Wyk, 1995), dwarf crag lizard, dwarf cliff lizard, endemic
 Genus Karusasaurus:
 Karusasaurus polyzonus (A. Smith, 1838), southern Karusa lizard, Karoo girdled lizard, syn. Zonurus polyzonus Duméril & Bibron, 1839, near endemic
 Genus Namazonurus:
 Namazonurus lawrenci (Fitzsimons, 1939), Lawrence's Nama lizard, Lawrence's girdled lizard, syn. Zonurus lawrenci Fitzsimons, 1939, Cordylus cordylus lawrenci Loveridge, 1944, endemic
 Namazonurus peersi Hewitt, 1932, Peers' Nama lizard, Peers' girdled lizard, Hewitt's spinytail lizard, syn. Zonurus peersi Fitzsimons, 1930, endemic
 Genus Ninurta:
 Ninurta coeruleopunctatus (Hewitt & Methuen, 1913), blue-spotted girdled lizard, syn. Zonurus coeruleopunctatus Hewitt & Methuen, 1913, Cordylus coeruleo-punctatus Fitzsimons, 1943, endemic
 Genus Oroborus:
 Ouroborus cataphractus (Boie, 1828), armadillo girdled lizard, syn. Zonurus cataphractus Gray, 1831, Cordylus nebulosus Smith, 1838, endemic
 Genus Platysaurus:
 Platysaurus capensis A. Smith, 1844, Cape flat lizard, endemic to southern Africa
 Platysaurus intermedius Matschie, 1891, common flat lizard, syn. Platysaurus guttatus intermedius Wermuth, 1968, Platysaurus guttatus natalensis Fitzsimons, 1948, Platysaurus guttatus nyasae Loveridge, 1953, Platysaurus guttatus rhodesianus Fitzsimons, 1941, Platysaurus guttatus subniger Broadley, 1962, Platysaurus guttatus wilhelmi Loveridge, 1944, Platysaurus intermedius inopinus Jacobsen, 1994, Platysaurus intermedius intermedius Matschie, 1891, Platysaurus intermedius natalensis Fitzsimons, 1948, Platysaurus intermedius nigrescens Broadley, 1981, Platysaurus intermedius nyasae Loveridge, 1953, Platysaurus intermedius parvus Broadley, 1976, Platysaurus intermedius rhodesianus Fitzsimons, 1941, Platysaurus intermedius subniger Broadley, 1962, Platysaurus intermedius wilhelmi Hewitt, 1909, Platysaurus wilhelmi Hewitt, 1909, Platysaurus wilhelmi wilhelmi Pienaar, 1966	
 Platysaurus intermedius inopinus Jacobsen, 1994, Blouberg flat lizard , syn. Platysaurus intermedius intermedius, syn.  Broadley, 1978, endemic
 Platysaurus intermedius intermedius Matschie, 1891, common flat lizard, syn. Platysaurus guttatus intermedius Wermuth, 1968, endemic
 Platysaurus intermedius natalensis Fitzsimons, 1948, Natal flat lizard, syn. Platysaurus intermedius Adolphs, 2006, Platysaurus guttatus natalensis Fitzsimons 1948, endemic
 Platysaurus intermedius nyasae Loveridge, 1953, common flat lizard, syn. Platysaurus intermedius inopinus Jacobsen, 1994, Platysaurus guttatus nyasae Loveridge, 1953
 Platysaurus intermedius parvus Broadley, 1976, lesser flat lizard, syn. Platysaurus intermedius natalensis Fitzsimons, 1948, endemic
 Platysaurus intermedius rhodesianus Fitzsimons, 1941, Zimbabwe flat lizard, syn. Platysaurus guttatus natalensis Fitzsimons, 1948, Platysaurus guttatus rhodesianus Fitzsimons, 1941, endemic to southern Africa
 Platysaurus intermedius subniger Broadley, 1962, common flat lizard, syn. Platysaurus intermedius natalensis Broadley, 1978, Platysaurus guttatus subniger Broadley, 1962	
 Platysaurus intermedius wilhelmi Hewitt, 1909, Wilhelm's flat lizard, syn. Platysaurus intermedius natalensis Boycott, 1992, Platysaurus guttatus wilhelmi Loveridge, 1944, Platysaurus wilhelmi wilhelmi Pienaar, 1966, endemic
 Platysaurus broadleyi Branch & Whiting, 1997, Augrabies flat lizard, endemic
 Platysaurus guttatus A. Smith, 1849, lesser flat lizard, syn. Platysaurus guttatus guttatus Auerbach, 1987, Platysaurus guttatus fitzsimonsi Loveridge, 1944, endemic
 Platysaurus lebomboensis Jacobsen, 1994, Lebombo flat lizard, near endemic
 Platysaurus minor Fitzsimons, 1930, Waterberg flat lizard, syn. Platysaurus guttatus minor Fitzsimons, 1930, endemic
 Platysaurus monotropis Jacobsen, 1994, orange-throated flat lizard, endemic
 Platysaurus orientalis Fitzsimons, 1941, Sekhukhune flat lizard, syn. Platysaurus orientalis orientalis Fitzsimons, 1941, Platysaurus guttatus orientalis Loveridge, 1944, Platysaurus minor orientalis Fitzsimons, 1941, Platysaurus orientalis fitzsimonsi Loveridge, 1944, Platysaurus guttatus fitzsimonsi Loveridge, 1944, Platysaurus fitzsimonsi Broadley, 1978, endemic
 Platysaurus orientalis fitzsimonsi Loveridge, 1944, FitzSimons' flat lizard, syn. Platysaurus guttatus orientalis, Platysaurus fitzsimonsi Broadley 1978, Platysaurus guttatus fitzsimonsi Loveridge 1944, endemic
 Platysaurus orientalis  orientalis Fitzsimons, 1941, Sekhukhune flat lizard, syn. Platysaurus minor orientalis, endemic
 Platysaurus relictus Broadley, 1976, Transvaal flat lizard, endemic
 Genus Pseudocordylus:
 Pseudocordylus langi Loveridge, 1944	Lang’s crag lizard, syn. Cordylus langi (Loveridge, 1944), endemic
 Pseudocordylus melanotus melanotus (A. Smith, 1838), common crag lizard, endemic
 Pseudocordylus melanotus subviridis (A. Smith, 1838), Drakensberg crag lizard, syn. Cordylus subviridis Smith, 1838, Pseudocordylus subviridis Hewitt, 1927, Cordylus subviridis, Pseudocordylus microlepidotus subviridis Fitzsimons, 1937, Pseudocordylus subviridis subviridis Fitzsimons 1943, endemic
 Pseudocordylus microlepidotus fasciatus A. Smith, 1838, Karoo crag lizard, Cordylus fasciatus, Cites, 2002, Cordylus algoensis Smith, 1838, Cordylus fasciatus Smith, 1838, Pseudocordylus fasciatus Hewitt 1927, endemic
 Pseudocordylus microlepidotus microlepidotus (Cuvier, 1829), Cape crag lizard, syn. Cordylus montanus Smith, 1838; Cordylus microlepidotus Cuvier, 1829, Zonurus microlepidotus Gray, 1831, Zonurus wittii Schlegel, 1834, endemic
 Pseudocordylus microlepidotus namaquensis Hewitt, 1927, Nuweveldberg crag lizard, syn. Cordylus microlepidotus namaquensis, Pseudocordylus microlepidotus namaquensis (Hewitt 1927), endemic
 Pseudocordylus spinosus Fitzsimon, 1947, spiny crag lizard, syn. Cordylus spinosus, endemic
 Pseudocordylus transvaalensis Fitzsimon, 1943, northern crag lizard, syn. Pseudocordylus subviridis transvaalensis Fitzsimons, 1943, Cordylus transvaalensis (Fitzsimons, 1943), endemic
 Genus Smaug:
 Smaug breyeri (Van Dam, 1921), Waterberg girdled lizard, syn. Cordylus warreni warreni Boycott, 1992, Cordylus breyeri Branch, 1998, Zonurus breyeni Van Dam, 1921, endemic
 Smaug giganteus Smith, 1844, giant girdled lizard, syn. Zonurus derbianus Gray, 1845, Zonurus giganteus Boulenger, 1885, endemic
 Smaug vandami (Fitzsimmons, 1930), Van Dam’s girdled lizard, syn. Cordylus vandami Branch, 1998, endemic
 Smaug warreni warreni (Boulenger, 1908), Warren's girdled lizard, syn. Zonurus warreni Boulenger, 1908, near endemic
 Smaug warreni barbertonensis (Van Dam, 1921), Barberton girdled lizard, syn. Cordylus warreni warreni Fitzsimons, 1943, Cordylus barbertonensis, Zonurus barbertonensis Van 1921, endemic
 Smaug warreni depressus (Fitzsimons, 1930), Zoutpansberg girdled lizard, Cordylus warreni barbertonensis (Van Dam, 1921), Cordylus depressus, Zonurus barbertonensis depressus Fitzsimons, 1930

Elapidae  
Family Elapidae
 Genus Aspidelaps:
 Aspidelaps lubricus Laurenti, 1768, Cape coral snake, syn. Natrix lubrica Laurenti, 1768, Naia somersetta Smith, 1826, Elaps lubricus Duméril & Bibron, 1854, Aspidelaps lubricus cowlesi Bogert, 1940, Aspidelaps lubricus infuscatus Mertens, 1954, Aspidelaps lubricus cowlesi Welch, 1994, Aspidelaps lubricus lubricus (Laurenti, 1768)
 Aspidelaps lubricus cowlesi Bogert, 1940, Angolan coral snake, syn. Naia somersetta Smith, 1826, Aspidelaps lubricus infuscatus Mertens, 1954 
 Aspidelaps lubricus lubricus (Laurenti, 1768), coral shield cobra, syn. Elaps lubricus Duméril & Bibron, 1854, Natrix lubrica Laurenti, 1768 
 Aspidelaps scutatus Smith, 1849, shield-nose snake, syn. Naia fula-fula Bianconi, 1849, Aspidelaps scutatus scutatus (Smith, 1849), Cyrtophis scutatus Smith, 1849, Aspidelaps scutatus bachrani Mertens, 1954, Aspidelaps scutatus fulafulus (Bianconi, 1849), Aspidelaps scutatus intermedius Broadley, 1968 
 Aspidelaps scutatus bachrani Mertens, 1954, shield-nose snake, syn. Cyrtophis scutatus Smith, 1849 
 Aspidelaps scutatus fulafulus (Bianconi, 1849), eastern shield-nose snake, syn. Crytophis [sic] scutatus Smith, 1849, Aspidelaps scutatus Boulenger 1896, Naia fulafula Bianconi 1849
 Aspidelaps scutatus intermedius Broadley, 1968, intermediate shield-nose snake, syn. Cyrtophis scutatus Smith, 1849, endemic 
 Aspidelaps scutatus scutatus (A. Smith, 1849), speckled shield cobra, syn. Aspidelaps scutatus Smith 1849, endemic to southern Africa 
 Genus Dendroaspis:
 Dendroaspis angusticeps (A. Smith, 1849), green mamba, syn. Dendroaspis sjöstedti Lönnberg, 1910, Naja angusticeps Smith, 1849, Dendraphis angusticeps Günther, 1858 
 Dendroaspis polylepis Günther, 1864, black mamba, syn. Dendroaspis polylepis polylepis Günther, 1864, Dendraspis antinorii Peters, 1873, Dendraspis angusticeps Boulenger, 1896, Dendroaspis polylepis antinorii (Peters, 1873), Dendraspis antinorii Peters 1873 
 Dendroaspis polylepis antinori (Peters, 1876), black mamba, syn. Dendraspis angusticeps Boulenger, 1896 
 Dendroaspis polylepis polylepis (Günther, 1864), black mamba, syn. Dendraspis polylepis Günther, 1864 
 Genus Elapsoidea:
 Elapsoidea boulengeri Boettger, 1895, Boulenger's garter snake, syn. Elapechis boulengeri Boulenger, 1896, Elapechis guentheri Peracca, 1896, Elapechis sundevallii Peracca, 1896, Elapsoidea sundevallii decosteri Loveridge, 1944, Elapsoidea semiannulata boulengeri Broadley, 1971, restricted to southeastern Africa 
 Elapsoidea semiannulata Bocage, 1882, Angolan garter snake, syn. Elapechis guentheri Boulenger, 1896, Elapsoidea decosteri huilensis Laurent, 1964, Elapsoidea sundevalli guentheri Loveridge, 1944, Elapsoidea güntherii Bocage, 1873, Elapsoidea sundevalli semiannulata Loveridge, 1944, Elapsoidea semiannulata semiannulata Broadley, 1971, Elapsoidea semiannulata moebiusi Werner, 1897, Elapsoidea decosteri moebiusi Laurent, 1956 
 Elapsoidea semiannulata moebiusi (Werner, 1897), Angolan garter snake, syn. Elapsoidea güntherii, Elapsoidea decosteri moebiusi Laurent, 1956, Elapsoidea moebiusi Werner, 1897, Elapsoidea sundevalli moebiusi Parker, 1949 
 Elapsoidea semiannulata semiannulata Bocage, 1882, Angolan garter snake, syn. Elapsoidea güntherii, Elapsoidea sundevalli semiannulata Loveridge, 1944 
 Elapsoidea sundevallii (A. Smith, 1848), Sundevall's garter snake, syn. Elapsoidea sundevallii sundevallii (Smith, 1848), Elapechis sundevallii Boulenger, 1896,  Elapsoidea sundevallii decosteri Boulenger, 1888, Elapsoidea decosteri Boulenger, 1888, Elapechis decosteri Sternfeld, 1910, Elapsoidea sundevalli fitzsimonsi Loveridge, 1944, Elapsoidea sundevallii longicauda Broadley, 1971, Elapsoidea sundevallii media Broadley, 1971, Elapechis guentheri Gough, 1908, endemic to southern Africa 
 Elapsoidea sundevallii fitzsimonsi Loveridge, 1944, Kalahari garter snake, syn. Elapsoidea sundevallii Peters, 1880 
 Elapsoidea sundevallii longicauda Broadley, 1971, Sundevall's garter snake, syn. Elapsoidea sundevalli fitzsimonsi Fitzsimons 1962 
 Elapsoidea sundevallii media Broadley, 1971, Highveld garter snake, syn. Elapechis guentheri Gough 1908, Elapechis sundevallii Gough 1908 
 Genus Hemachatus:
 Hemachatus haemachatus Lacépède, 1789, rinkhals, syn. Aspidelaps haemachates Jan, 1859, Coluber haemachates Bonnaterre, 1790, Naia capensis Smith, 1826, Naja haemachates Schlegel, 1837, Sepedon haemachates Merrem, 1820, Vipera haemachates Latreille, 1801, Vipere haemachate Lacépède, 1789, Sipedon haemachates Lockington, 1886, near endemic 
 Genus Naja:
 Naja nigricollis Reinhardt, 1843, black-necked spitting cobra, syn. Naja nigricollis crawshayi Günther, 1893, Naja nigricollis atriceps Laurent, 1955, Naja nigricollis occidentalis Laurent, 1973, Naja nigricollis nigricollis Broadley & Howell, 1991, Naja crawshayi Broadley & Cotterill, 2004, Naja (Afronaja) nigricollis Wallach, et al. 2009, Naja nigricillis occidentalis Bocage 1895 
 Naja anchietae Bocage, 1879, Anchieta's cobra, syn. Naja annulifera anchietae Broadley, 1995, Naja haje Boettger, 1887, Naja haje anchietae Mertens, 1937, Naia anchietae Boulenger, 1896, Naja (Uraeus) anchietae Wallach et al. 2009 
 Naja annulifera Peters, 1854, snouted cobra, syn. Naja haje annulifera Peters, 1854, Naja haie Boulenger, 1896, Naja nigricollis' Curtis, 1911, Naja haje haje' Bogert, 1943, Naja haje annulifera Auerbach, 1987, Naja (Uraeus) annulifera Wallach et al. 2009 
 Naja melanoleuca Hallowell, 1857, forest cobra, syn. Aspidelaps bocagii Sauvage, 1884, Naja annulata Buchholz & Peters, 1876, Naja haje leucosticta Fischer, 1885, Naja haje melanoleuca Hallowell, 1857, Naja leucostica Bethencourt-Ferreira, 1930, Naja melanoleuca Matschie, 1893, Naja melanoleuca aurata Stucki-Stirn, 1979, Naja melanoleuca melanoleuca Capocaccia, 1961, Naja melanoleuca subfulva Laurent, 1955, Naja subfulva Chirio et al., 2006, Naja (Boulengerina) melanoleuca Wallach et al., 2009 
 Naja mossambica Peters, 1854, Mozambique spitting cobra, syn. Naja nigricollis nigricollis (Boycott, 1992), Naja mossambica mossambica Fischer, 1884, Naja nigricollis mossambica Fischer, 1884, Naja (Afronaja) mossambica Wallach et al., 2009 
 Naja nigricincta woodi Pringle, 1955, black spitting cobra, endemic to southern Africa 
 Naja nivea (Linnaeus, 1758), Cape cobra, syn. Coluber niveus Linnaeus, 1758, Vipera (Echidna) flava Merrem, 1820, Naja gutturalis Smith, 1838, Naja intermixta Duméril & Duméril, 1854, Naja haje capensis Jan, 1863, Naja flava Boulenger, 1887, Naja (Uraeus) nivea Wallach et al., 2009, endemic to southern Africa

Gekkonidae  
Family Gekkonidae
 Genus Afroedura:
 Afroedura africana Boulenger, 1888 African flat gecko, syn. Oedura africana Boulenger, 1888, endemic 
 Afroedura africana africana (Boulenger, 1888), African rock gecko 
 Afroedura africana namaquensis (Fitzsimons, 1938), African rock gecko, syn. Afroedura namaquensis Loveridge, 1947, Oedura namaquensis Fitzsimmons, 1938, endemic 
 Afroedura africana tirasensis Haacke, 1965, African rock gecko
 Afroedura amatolica (Hewitt, 1925), Amatola rock gecko, syn. Oedura amatolica Hewitt, 1925, Afroedura amatolica Welch, 1994, Afroedura nivaria Loveridge 1947, endemic
 Afroedura hawequensis  Mouton & Mostet, 1985, Cape rock gecko, syn. Afroedura hawequensis Rösler 1995, endemic 
 Afroedura karroica (Hewitt, 1925), inland rock  gecko, syn. Oedura karroica Hewitt, 1925, endemic 
 Afroedura karroica halli (Hewitt, 1935), inland rock gecko, syn. Afroedura karroica Hewitt 1925, Oedura halli Hewitt, 1935, Afroedura halli Branch, 1998, endemic 
 Afroedura karroica karroica (Hewitt, 1926), inland rock gecko, syn. Afroedura karroica Hewitt 1925, Oedura karroica wilmoti Hewitt, 1926 
 Afroedura nivaria (Boulenger, 1894), Drakensberg rock gecko, syn. Oedura nivaria Boulenger, 1894, Afroedura nivara Barts, 2004, endemic 
 Afroedura pondolia (Hewitt, 1925), Pondo rock gecko, syn. Oedura pondolia Hewitt, 1925, Oedura pondoensis Power, 1935 endemic 
 Afroedura pondolia haackei Onderstall, 1984, Pondo rock gecko, syn. Afroedura pondolia Branch, 1998, Afroedura multiporis haackei Jacobson, 1992 
 Afroedura pondolia langi (Fitzsimons, 1930), Pondo rock gecko, syn. Afroedura pondolia pondolia (Hewitt, 1925), Afroedura langi Jacobson, 1922, Oedura langi Fitzsimons, 1930, near endemic 
 Afroedura pondolia major Onderstall, 1984, Pondo rock gecko, syn. Oedura langi Fitzsimons, 1930, Afroedura major Branch, 1988, endemic 
 Afroedura pondolia marleyi (Fitzsimons, 1930), Pondo rock gecko, syn. Afroedura pondolia pondolia (Hewitt, 1925), Afroedura major, Oedura marleyi Fitzsimons, 1930, Afroedura marleyi Branch, 1998, endemic 
 Afroedura pondolia multiporis (Hewitt, 1925), Pondo rock gecko, syn. Afroedura pondolia haackei Onderstall, 1984, Afroedura multiporis Rösler, 2000, Afroedura multiporis haackei Jacobson, 1992, Afroedura multiporis haackei Rösler, 2000, Afroedura multiporis multiporis Jacobson, 1992, Oedura pondolia multiporis Hewitt, 1925, endemic 
 Afroedura pondolia pondolia (Hewitt, 1925), Pondo rock gecko, syn. Oedura pondoensis, Oedura langi Fitzsimmons, 1930 
 Afroedura tembulica (Hewitt, 1926), Queenstown rock gecko, syn. Oedura tembulica Hewitt, 1926, endemic 
 Afroedura transvaalica (Hewitt, 1925)' Transvaal rock  gecko, syn. Oedura transvaalica Hewitt, 1925, Oedura transvaalica Hewitt, 1925, Oedura transvaalica platyceps Hewitt, 1925, endemic to southern Africa 
 Afroedura transvaalica loveridgei Broadley, 1963, Loveridge’s rock gecko, syn. Oedura transvaalensis Fitzsimons, 1930, Afroedura loveridgei Bauer, 1997, Afroedura transvaalica loveridgei Broadley, 1963 
 Afroedura transvaalica transvaalica (Hewitt, 1925), Transvaal rock gecko, syn. Oedura transvaalica platyceps Hewitt, 1925 
 Genus Afrogecko:
 Afrogecko porphyreus (Daudin, 1802), syn. porphyreus Daudin, 1802, Phyllodactylus porphyreus Duméril, 1836, Phyllodactylus porphyreus cronwrigthi Hewitt, 1937, Phyllodactylus porphyreus namaquensis Hewitt, 1935, endemic 
 Afrogecko porphyreus porphyreus (Daudin, 1802), syn. Phyllodactylus porphyreus namaquensis, endemic 
 Afrogecko porphyreus cronwrigthi (Hewitt, 1937), syn. Phyllodactylus porphyreus, endemic 
 Afrogecko porphyreus namaquensis (Hewitt, 1935), syn. Phyllodactylus porphyreus, endemic 
 Afrogecko swartbergensis (Haacke, 1996), Swartberg leaf-toed gecko, syn. Phyllodactylus swartbergensis Haacke, 1996, endemic 
 Genus Chondrodactylus:
 Chondrodactylus angulifer Peters, 1870, Namib giant ground gecko, syn. Chondrodactylus weiri Boulenger, 1887 
 Chondrodactylus angulifer namibensis Haacke, 1976, Namib giant ground gecko, syn. Chondrodactylus angulifer Peters 1870 
 Chondrodactylus angulifer angulifer Peters, 1870, common giant ground gecko, syn. Chondrodactylus weiri Boulenger, 1887 
 Chondrodactylus bibronii (A. Smith, 1846), Bibron's thick-toed gecko, syn. Tarentola bibronii Smith, 1846, Pachydactylus bibronii Boulenger, 1885, Chondrodactylus bibronii Bauer & Lamb, 2005 
 Chondrodactylus turneri (Gray, 1864), Turner's thick-toed gecko, syn. Homodactylus turneri Gray, 1864, Pachydactylus (bibronii) var. stellatus Werner, 1910, Pachydactylus bibroni turneri Parker, 1936, Pachydactylus bibronii turneri Loveridge, 1947, Pachydactylus laevigatus turneri Benyr, 1995, Pachydactylus turneri Bates & Heideman, 1997, Chondrodactylus turneri laevigatus Bauer & Lamb, 2005, Pachydactylus turneri laevigatus Cimatti, 2007, Pachydactylus bibronii stellatus Werner, 1910, Pachydactylus laevigatus Fischer, 1888 
 Genus Colopus:
 Colopus kochii Fitzsimons, 1959, Cape Cross thick-toed gecko, syn. Pachydactylus kochii Fitzsimons, 1959 
 Colopus wahlbergii Peters, 1869, Walhberg's Kalahari  gecko, syn. Colopus marshalli Fitzsimons, 1959, Colopus kalaharicus Fitzsimmons, 1932 
 Colopus wahlbergii furcifer Haacke, 1976, Striped ground gecko, syn. Colopus kalaharicus Fitzsimons, 1932 
 Colopus wahlbergii wahlbergii Peters, 1869, Kalahari ground gecko, syn. Colopus wahlbergii Peters, 1869 
 Genus Cryptactites:
 Cryptactites peringueyi (Boulenger, 1910), Peringuey's leaf-toed gecko, syn. Phyllodactylus peringueyi Boulenger, 1910 endemic 
 Genus Goggia:
 Goggia braacki  (Good, Bauer & Branch, 1996), Braack's pygmy gecko, syn. Phyllodactylus braacki Good, Bauer & Branch, 1996, endemic 
 Goggia essexi (Hewitt, 1925), Essex's pygmy gecko, syn. Phyllodactylus essexi Hewitt, 1925, Phyllodactylus lineatus essexi Hewitt, 1937, endemic 
 Goggia gemmula Branch, (Bauer & Good, 1996), Richtersveld pygmy gecko, syn. Phyllodactylus gemmulus Branch, Bauer & Good, 1996, near endemic 
 Goggia hewitti (Branch, Bauer & Good, 1995), Hewitt's leaf-toed gecko, syn. Phyllodactylus hewitt Branch, Bauer & Good, 1995, Phyllodactylus lineatus rupicolus Fitzsimons, 1943, endemic 
 Goggia hexapora (Branch, Bauer & Good, 1995) Cederberg pygmy gecko, syn. Phyllodactylus hexaporus Branch, Bauer & Good, 1995, Phyllodactylus lineatus Fitzsimons, 1935, Phyllodactylus lineatus rupicolus Fitzsimons, 1943, endemic 
 Goggia lineata (Gray, 1838), striped pygmy gecko, syn. Diplodactylus lineatus Gray, 1845, Phyllodactylus lineatus Gray, 1838, Phyllodactylus lineatus lineatus Hewitt, 1937, Phyllodactylus porphyreus Werner, 1910, near endemic 
 Goggia microlepidota (Fitzsimons, 1939), Fitzsimons' leaf-toed gecko, syn. Phyllodactylus microlepidotus Fitzsimons, 1939, endemic 
 Goggia rupicola (Fitzsimons, 1938), Namaqua leaf-toed  gecko, syn. Phyllodactylus rupicolus Branch et al., 1995, Phyllodactylus lineatus rupicolus Fitzsimons, 1938, endemic 
 Genus Hemidactylus:
 Hemidactylus mabouia (Moreau De Jonnès, 1818), Moreau's tropical house gecko, syn. Gecko mabuia Cuvier, 1829, Gekko aculeatus Spix, 1825, Gekko armatus Wied, 1824, Gekko cruciger Spix, 1825, Gekko incanescens Wied, 1824, Gekko mabouia Moreau De Jonnès, 1818, Gekko tuberculosus Raddi, 1823, Hemidactylus (Tachybates) armatus Fitzinger, 1846, Hemidactylus (Tachybates) mabuya Fitzinger, 1846, Hemidactylus benguellensis Bocage, 1893, Hemidactylus exaspis Cope, 1868, Hemidactylus frenatus calabaricus Boettger, 1878, Hemidactylus gardineri Boulenger, 1909, Hemidactylus mabouia mabouia Auerbach, 1987, Hemidactylus mandanus Loveridge, 1936, Hemidactylus mercatorius Gray, 1842, Hemidactylus persimilis Barbour & Loveridge, 1928, Hemidactylus platycephalus Peters, 1854, Hemidactylus sakalava Grandidier, 1867, Hemidactylus tasmani Hewitt, 1932, Hemidactylus tuberculosus Fitzinger, 1826, Gekko mabouia Moreau, 1818 
 Genus Homopholis:
 Homopholis muller Visser, 1987 Muller's velvet gecko, syn. Platypholis mulleri Kluge, 1993 endemic 
 Homopholis wahlbergii (A. Smith, 1849) Wahlberg's velvet gecko, syn. Geko walbergii Smith, 1849, Platypholis walbergii 
 Homopholis walbergii arnoldi Loveridge, 1944 Wahlberg's velvet gecko, syn. Homopholis walbergii Smith 1849 
 Homopholis walbergii walbergii (Smith, 1849) Wahlberg's velvet gecko, syn. Homopholis macrolepis Boulenger, 1885 
 Genus Lygodactylus:
 Lygodactylus angolensis Bocage, 1896, Angola dwarf gecko, syn. Lygodactylus laurae Schmidt, 1933, Lygodactylus (Lygodactylus) angolensis Rösler, 2000 
 Lygodactylus bradfieldi (Hewitt, 1932), Bradfield's dwarf gecko, syn. Lygodactylus capensis bradfieldi Auerbach, 1987, Lygodactylus (Lygodactylus) bradfieldi Rösler, 2000 
 Lygodactylus capensis Smith, 1849, Cape yellow-headed gecko, syn. Hemidactylus capensis Smith, 1849, Lygodactylus (Lygodactylus) capensis Rösler, 2000, Lygodactylus ngamiensis Fitzsimmons, 1932, Lygodactylus strigatus Gray, 1864 
 Lygodactylus capensis capensis (A. Smith, 1849) common dwarf gecko, syn. Lygodactylus strigatus Gray, 1864, Lygodactylus (Lygodactylus) capensis Rösler, 2000 
 Lygodactylus capensis pakenhami Loveridge, 1941 Cape dwarf gecko, syn. Lygodactylus capensis Boulenger, 1885, Lygodactylus grotei Sternfeld, 1911, Lygodactylus grotei pakenhami Loveridge, 1941, Lygodactylus (Lygodactylus) capensis Rösler, 2000 
 Lygodactylus capensis grotei Sternfeld, 1911, Cape dwarf gecko, syn. Lygodactylus ngamiensis Fitzsimmons, 1932, Lygodactylus grotei Sternfeld, 1911, Lygodactylus (Lygodactylus) capensis Rösler, 2000 
 Lygodactylus graniticolus Jacobsen, 1992, granite dwarf gecko, syn. Lygodactylus (Lygodactylus) graniticolus Rösler, 2000, endemic 
 Lygodactylus methueni Fitzsimons, 1937, woodbrush dwarf gecko, syn. Lygodactylus (Lygodactylus) methueni Rösler, 2000, endemic 
 Lygodactylus nigropunctatus Jacobsen, 1992 black-spotted dwarf gecko, syn. Lygodactylus nigropunctatus nigropunctatus Jacobsen, 1992, endemic 
 Lygodactylus nigropunctatus incognitus Jacobsen, 1992, cryptic dwarf gecko, syn. Lygodactylus nigropunctatus soutpansbergensis Jacobsen, 1992, Lygodactylus (Lygodactylus) nigropunctatus Rösler, 2000 endemic 
 Lygodactylus nigropunctatus montiscaeruli Jacobsen, 1992, Makgabeng dwarf gecko, syn. Lygodactylus (Lygodactylus) nigropunctatus incognitus Jacobsen, 1992, endemic 
 Lygodactylus nigropunctatus nigropunctatus Jacobsen, 1992, black-spotted dwarf gecko, syn. Lygodactylus (Lygodactylus) nigropunctatus Rösler, 2000, endemic 
 Lygodactylus ocellatus  Roux, 1907, ocellated dwarf gecko, syn. Lygodactylus (Lygodactylus) ocellatus Rösler, 2000 
 Lygodactylus ocellatus ocellatus Roux, 1907, syn. Lygodactylus ocellatus Roux, 1907, endemic
 Lygodactylus ocellatus soutpansbergensis Jacobsen, 1994, Soutpansberg Dwarf  gecko, syn. Lygodactylus ocellatus Roux, 1907, endemic 
 Lygodactylus stevensoni Hewitt, 1926, Stevenson's dwarf gecko 
 Lygodactylus waterbergensis Jacobsen, 1992, Waterberg dwarf gecko, syn. Lygodactylus (Lygodactylus) waterbergensis Rösler, 2000, endemic 
 Genus Narudasia:
 Narudasia festiva Methuen & Hewitt, 1914, festive gecko, syn. Quedenfeldtia festiva Loveridge, 1947 
 Genus Pachydactylus:
 Pachydactylus affinis Boulenger, 1896, Transvaal gecko, syn. Pachydactylus formosus Roux, 1907, Pachydactylus formosus affinis Hewitt, 1910, Pachydactylus capensis affinis Hewitt, 1927, endemic 
 Pachydactylus amoenus Werner, 1910, Kamaggas gecko, endemic 
 Pachydactylus atorquatus Bauer et al., 2006, Augrabies gecko, endemic 
 Pachydactylus austeni Hewitt, 1923, Austen thick-toed gecko, syn. Pachydactylus austeni, endemic 
 Pachydactylus barnardi Fitzsimons, 1941, Barnard's thick-toed gecko, syn. Pachydactylus capensis barnardi Fizsimons, 1941, Pachydactylus rugosus barnadi Rösler, 2000 endemic 
 Pachydactylus capensis (A. Smith, 1846) Cape thick-toed gecko, syn. Tarentola capensis Smith, 1846, Pachydactylus capensis capensis Fitzsimons, 1935, Pachydactylus capensis katanganus De Witte, 1953, Pachydactylus capensis levyi Fitzsimons, 1933, Pachydactylus capensis oshaughnessyi Loveridge, 1947, Pachydactylus elegans Gray, 1845, Pachydactylus leopardinus Sternfeld, 1911, Pachydactylus mentalis Hewitt, 1926, Pachydactylus obscurus Thominot, 1889, Pachydactylus tessellatus Werner, 1910, Pachydactylus werneri Hewitt, 1935 
 Pachydactylus carinatus Bauer, Lamb & Branch, 2006, Richtersveld gecko, syn. Pachydactylus serval onscepensis Mclachlan 1966, Pachydactylus cf serval Bauer 2003, endemic to southern Africa 
 Pachydactylus formosus (A. Smith, 1849), Smith's thick-toed gecko, syn. Pachydactylus mento-marginatus Smith, 1849, Pachydactylus mentomarginatus Boulenger, 1885, Pachydactylus obscurus Thominot, 1889, Pachydactylus capensis formosus Loveridge, 1947, Pachydactylus mentomarginatus Smith, 1849, Pachydactylus rugosus formosus Joger, 1985, endemic 
 Pachydactylus geitje (Sparrman, 1778), Cradock thick-toed gecko, syn. Anoplopus inunguis Wagler, 1830,  gecko inunguis Cuvier, 1817,  gecko ocellatus Cuvier, 1817, Lacerta geitje Sparrman, 1778, Pachydactylus bergii Wiegmann, 1834, Pachydactylus ocellatus Boulenger, 1885, Platydactylus ocellatus Duméril & Bibron, 1836, endemic 
 Pachydactylus goodi Bauer, Lamb & Brach, 2006, Good's gecko, syn. Pachydactylus werberi Bauer 2005, endemic 
 Pachydactylus haackei Branch, Bauer, & Good, 1996 Haacke's thick-toed gecko, syn. Pachydactylus namaquensis Methuen & Hewitt, 1914, endemic 
 Pachydactylus kladeroderma Branch, Bauer & Good, 1996, fragile thick-toed gecko, syn. Pachydactylus namaquensis Fitzsimons, 1943, Pachydactylus kladeroderma Branch 1998 endemic 
 Pachydactylus labialis Fitzsimons, 1938, Western Cape thick-toed gecko, syn. Pachydactylus capensis labialis Fitzsimons, 1938, endemic 
 Pachydactylus maculatus Gray, 1845, spotted thick-toed gecko, syn. Pachydactylus maculatus albomarginatus Hewitt, 1932, Pachydactylus maculatus microlepis Hewitt, 1935, Pachydactylus maculosa Brock, 1932, endemic 
 Pachydactylus mariquensis Smith, 1849, Ceres thick-toed gecko, syn. Pachydactylus latirostris Hewitt, 1923, Pachydactylus mariequensis macrolepis Fitzsimons, 1939, Pachydactylus mariquensis macrolepis Fitzsimons, 1939, endemic 
 Pachydactylus mariquensis latirostris Hewitt, 1923, Ceres thick-toed gecko, syn. Pachydactylus mariquensis Smith, 1849, Pachydactylus latirostris Hewitt, 1923 
 Pachydactylus mariquensis mariquensis Smith, 1849, Ceres thick-toed gecko, syn. Pachydactylus mariquensis Smith, 1849 
 Pachydactylus montanus Methuen & Hewitt, 1914, Namaqua mountain gecko, syn. Pachydactylus serval Loveridge, 1947, Pachydactylus montanus montanus Fitzsimons, 1943, Pachydactylus montanus onscepensis Hewitt, 1935, Pachydactylus serval onceepensis Hewitt, 1935 
 Pachydactylus monticolus Fitzsimons, 1943, endemic 
 Pachydactylus namaquensis (Sclater, 1898), Namaqua thick-toed gecko, syn. Elasmodactylus namaquensis Sclater, 1898, near endemic 
 Pachydactylus oculatus Hewitt, 1927, golden spotted gecko, syn. Pachydactylus capensis oculatus Hewitt, 1927, endemic 
 Pachydactylus oshaughnessyi Boulenger, 1885, syn. Pachydactylus oshaughnessyi oshaughnessyi Boulenger 1885 
 Pachydactylus oshaughnessyi katanganus de Witte, 1953, syn. Pachydactylus oshaughnessyi Boulenger, 1885, Pachydactylus capensis katanganus de Witte, 1953 
 Pachydactylus oshaughnessyi oshaughnessyi Boulenger, 1885, syn. Pachydactylus oshaughnessyi Boulenger, 1885, Pachydactylus capensis levyi Fitzsimmons, 1933, Pachydactylus capensis oshaughnessyi Loveridge, 1947, Pachydactylus capensis oshaughnessyi Loveridge, 1947, Pachydactylus capensis o’shaughnessyi Pitman, 1934 
 Pachydactylus punctatus amoenoides Hewitt, 1935, pointed thick-toed gecko, syn. Pachydactylus punctatus Peters, 1854
 Pachydactylus punctatus Peters, 1854, speckled gecko, syn. Pachydactylus langi Fitzsimons, 1932, Pachydactylus brunnthaleri Werner, 1913 
 Pachydactylus punctatus punctatus Peters, 1855, pointed thick-toed gecko, syn. Pachydactylus brunnthaleri Werner, 1913
 Pachydactylus purcelli Boulenger, 1910 Purcell's gecko, syn. Pachydactylus (serval) purcelli Mclachlan & Spence, 1966, Pachydactylus serval purcelli Boulenger, 1910, Pachydactylus pardus Sternfeld, 1911  
 Pachydactylus rangei (Andersson, 1908) Namib web-footed gecko, syn. Syndactylosaura schultzei Werner, 1910, Palmato gecko rangei Andersson, 1908, Palmato gecko rangeri Pianka, 2003, endemic to southern Africa 
 Pachydactylus rugosus A. Smith, 1849, wrinkled thick-toed gecko, syn. Pachydactylus rugosus frater Hewitt, 1935, Pachydactylus rugosus rugosus Auerbach, 1987, endemic to southern Africa 
 Pachydactylus scutatus Hewitt, 1927, shielded thick-toed gecko, syn. Pachydactylus angolensis Bauer et al., 2002, Pachydactylus scutatus angolensis Loveridge, 1944, Pachydactylus robertsi Fitzsimons, 1938 
 Pachydactylus scutatus angolensis Loveridge, 1944, large-scaled gecko, syn. Pachydactylus scutatus Hewitt, 1927, Pachydactylus angolensis Bauer, 2002 
 Pachydactylus scutatus scutatus Hewitt, 1927, large-scaled gecko, syn. Pachydactylus scutatus Hewitt, 1927 
 Pachydactylus serval Werner, 1910, Werner's thick-toed gecko, syn. Pachydactylus pardus Sternfeld, 1911, Pachydactylus carinatus Bauer et al., 2006 
 Pachydactylus serval onsceepensis Hewitt, 1935, western spotted thick-toed gecko, syn. Pachydactylus pardus Sternfeld, 1911 
 Pachydactylus serval serval Werner, 1910, western spotted thick-toed gecko, syn. Pachydactylus serval Loveridge, 1947 
 Pachydactylus tigrinus Van Dam, 1921, tiger thick-toed gecko, syn. Pachydactylus capensis rhodesianus Loveridge, 1947, Pachydactylus capensis tigrinus Van Dam, 1921, restricted to southern Africa 
 Pachydactylus vansoni Fitzsimons, 1933, Van Son's thick-toed gecko, syn. Pachydactylus capensis vansoni Fitzsimons, 1933, near endemic 
 Pachydactylus visseri Bauer, Lamb & Branch, 2006, Visser's gecko, syn. Pachydactylus weberi Branch 1998, endemic to southern Africa 
 Pachydactylus weberi  Roux, 1907, Weber's thick-toed  gecko, syn. Pachydactylus weberi weberi Fitzsimons, 1938, Pachydactylus weberi gariesensis Loveridge, 1947, Pachydactylus capensis capensis Peters, 1870, Pachydactylus capensis gariesensis Hewitt, 1932, Pachydactylus capensis weberi Lawrence, 1936, Pachydactylus acuminatus Fitzsimmons, 1941, Pachydactylus goodi Bauer et al., 2006, Pachydactylus monicae Bauer et al., 2006, Pachydactylus visseri Bauer et al., 2006, near endemic 
 Genus Phelsuma:
 Phelsuma ocellata (Boulenger, 1885) Namaqua day gecko, syn. Rhoptropus ocellatus Boulenger, 1885, Phelsuma ocellata Schmidt, 1933, Rhoptropella ocellata Hewitt, 1937, near endemic 
 Genus Ptenopus:
 Ptenopus garrulus Smith, 1849, whistling gecko, syn. Stenodactylus garrulous Smith, 1849, Ptenopus maculatus Gray, 1866 
 Ptenopus garrulus garrulus (A. Smith, 1849), common barking gecko, syn. Ptenopus garrulus Fitzsimons & Brain, 1958, endemic to southern Africa 
 Ptenopus garrulus maculatus Gray, 1866, spotted barking gecko, syn. Ptenopus garrulus Boulenger, 1885, Ptenopus maculatus Gray, 1866, endemic to southern Africa 
 Genus Rhoptropus:
 Rhoptropus barnardi Hewitt, 1926, Barnard's Namib day gecko 
 Rhoptropus boultoni Schmidt, 1933, Boulton's Namib day gecko 
 Rhoptropus boultoni benguellensis Mertens, 1938, Boulton's Namib day gecko, syn. Rhoptropus boultoni Schmidt, 1933 
 Rhoptropus boultoni boultoni Schmidt, 1933, Boulton's Namib day gecko, syn. Rhoptropus boultoni Schmidt, 1933 
 Rhoptropus boultoni montanus Laurent, 1964, Boulton's Namib day gecko, syn. Rhoptropus boultoni Schmidt, 1933 
 Rhoptropus diporus Hewitt, 1935, day gecko, endemic

Gerrhosauridae  
Family Gerrhosauridae 
 Genus Broadleysaurus:
 Broadleysaurus major (Duméril, 1851), rough-scaled plated lizard, syn. Gerrhosaurus major 
 Genus Cordylosaurus:
 Cordylosaurus subtessellatus (A. Smith, 1844), dwarf plated lizard, syn. Gerrhosaurus subtessellatus Smith, 1844, Pleurostrichus subtessellatus Gray, 1845, Gerrhosaurus trivittatus Peters, 1862, Cordylosaurus trivittatus australis Hewitt, 1932, Cordylosaurus trivittatus Gray, 1865 
 Genus Gerrhosaurus:
 Gerrhosaurus flavigularis Wiegmann, 1828, yellow-throated plated lizard, syn. Gerrhosaurus bibroni Smith, 1844, Gerrhosaurus flavigularis fitzsimonsi Loveridge, 1942, Gerrhosaurus flavigularis flavigularis Wiegmann, 1828, Gerrhosaurus flavigularis quadrilineata Boettger, 1883, Gerrhosaurus ocellatus Cocteau, 1834, Pleuortuchus [sic] chrysobronchus Smith, 1836, Pleuortuchus [sic] desjardinii Smith, 1836, endemic to sub-Saharan Africa 
 Gerrhosaurus major Duméril, 1851, rough-scaled plated lizard, syn. Gerrhosaurus major major Duméril, 1851, Gerrhosaurus bergi Werner, 1906, Gerrhosaurus grandis Boulenger, 1908, Gerrhosaurus major zechi Loveridge, 1936, Gerrhosaurus zechi Schmidt, 1919, Gerrhosaurus zanzibaricus Pfeffer, 1889, Gerrhosaurus major grandis Hewitt, 1910, Gerrhosaurus major bottegoi Del Prato, 1895, Gerrhosaurus bottegoi Del Prato, 1895 
 Gerrhosaurus intermedius Lönnberg, 1907, black-lined plated lizard, syn. Gerrhosaurus nigrolineatus nigrolineatus Hallowell, 1857, Gerrhosaurus nigro-lineatus Hallowell, 1857, Gerrhosaurus flavigularis intermedia Lönnberg, 1907, Gerrhosaurus flavigularis nigrolieatus Schmidt, 1919, Gerrhosaurus nigrolineatus australis Fitzsimons, 1939, Gerrhosaurus nigrolineatus ahlefedti Hellmich & Schmelcher, 1956 
 Gerrhosaurus typicus (A. Smith, 1837), Karoo plated lizard, syn. Pleurotuchus typicus Smith, 1837, endemic 
 Genus Matobosaurus:
 Matobosaurus validus Smith, 1849, common giant plated lizard, syn. Gerrhosaurus validus validus Smith, 1849, Gerrhosaurus ciprianii Gray, 1864, Gerrhosaurus maltzahni De Grys, 1938, Gerrhosaurus validus damarensis Fitzsimons, 1938, Gerrhosaurus robustus Peters, 1854, Gerrhosaurus validus maltzahni De Grys, 1938, Gerrhosaurus maltzahni De Grys, 1938, endemic to southern Africa 
 Genus Tetradactylus:
 Tetradactylus eastwoodae Hewitt & Methuen, 1913, Eastwoods whip lizard, endemic 
 Tetradactylus africanus (Gray, 1838), African whip lizard, syn. Tetredactylus africanus africanus (Gray, 1838), Tetredactylus fitzsimonsi Hewitt, 1915, Caitia africana Gray, 1838, Tetradactylus africanus fitzsimonsi Branch, 1988, Caitia africana Gray 1838, endemic 
 Tetradactylus breyeri Roux, 1907, Breyer's whip lizard, endemic 
 Tetradactylus fitzsimonsi Hewitt, 1915, FitzSimons' long-tailed seps, syn. Tetradactylus africanus fitzsimonsi endemic 
 Tetradactylus seps (Linnaeus, 1758) five-toed whip lizard, syn. Lacerta seps Linnaeus, 1758, Sincus [sic] sepiformis Schneider, 1801, Gerrhosaurus sepiformis Duméril & Bibron, 1839, Tetradactylus laevicauda Hewitt & Methuen, 1915, Tetradactylus seps laevicauda Loveridge, 1942, endemic 
 Tetradactylus tetradactylus (Daudin, 1802) longtail whip lizard, syn. Chalcides tetradactylus Daudin, 1802, Tetradactylus chalcidicus Merrem, 1820, Saurophis tetradactylus Wagler, 1830, Saurophis lacepedii Duméril & Bibron, 1839, Tetradactylus bilineatus Hewitt, 1926, Tetradactylus tetradactylus bilineatus Loveridge, 1942, endemic

Hydrophiidae 
Family Hydrophiidae
 Genus Hydrophis:
 Hydrophis platurus (Linnaeus, 1766), Yellow-bellied Sea Snake, syn. Anguis platura Linnaeus, 1766, Hydrophis pelamis Schlegel, 1837, Hydrophis (Pelamis) bicolor Fischer, 1855Hydrus bicolor Schneider, 1799,Hydrus platurus Boulenger, 1896' Pelamis bicolor Schneider, 1799, Pelamis bicolor sinuata Duméril, 1854, Pelamis bicolor variegata Duméril, 1854, Pelamis ornata Gray, 1842, Pelamis platuros Daudin, 1803, Pelamis platurus Smith, 1943, Pelamis schneider Rafinesque, 1817

Lacertidae  
Family Lacertidae 
 Genus Australolacerta:
 Australolacerta australis (Hewitt 1926), southern rock lizard, syn.  Lacerta australis Hewitt, 1926 endemic 
 Genus Heliobolus:
 Heliobolus lugubris (A. Smith, 1838), bushveld lizard, syn.  Eremias dorsalis Duméril & Bibron, 1839, Eremias lugubris Duméril & Bibron, 1839, Lacerta lugubris Smith, 1838 
 Genus Ichnotropis:
 Ichnotropis capensis (A. Smith, 1838), Cape rough-scaled lizard, syn.  Algyra capensis Smith, 1838, Tropidosaura dumerelii Smith, 1849, Ichnotropis microlepidota Peters, 1854, Ichnotropis microlepidota Peters, 1854, Ichnotropis dumerelii Bocage, 1866, Ichnotropis capensis Boulenger, 1897, Thermophilus capensis Fitzinger, 1843, Tropidosaura capensis Duméril, 1839 endemic to southern Africa 
 Ichnotropis capensis capensis (Smith, 1838), Cape rough-scaled lizard, syn.  Tropidosaura capensis Dumeril & Bibron, 1839 
 Ichnotropis capensis nigrescens Laurent, 1952, Cape rough-scaled lizard, syn.  Thermophilus capensis Dumeril & Bibron, 1844 
 Ichnotropis squamulosa (Peters, 1854), common rough-scaled lizard, endemic to southern Africa 
 Genus Meroles:
 Meroles ctenodactylus (A. Smith, 1838), Smith's sand lizard, syn.  Eremias capensis Duméril & Bibron, 1839, Lacerta capensis Smith, 1838, Lacerta ctenodactylus Smith, 1838, Scapteira ctenodactyla Loveridge, 1936, Meroles ctenodactyla Burrage, 1978 
 Meroles cuneirostris (Strauch, 1867), wedge-snouted sand lizard, syn.  Scapteira cuneirostris Strauch, 1867 
 Meroles knoxii (Milne-Edwards, 1829), Knox's ocellated sand lizard, syn.  Lacerta knoxii Milne-Edwards, 1829, Eremias knoxii Duméril & Bibron, 1839 
 Meroles suborbitalis Peters, 1869, spotted sand lizard, syn. Eremias suborbitalis Peters, 1869, Scaptira suborbitalis Fitzsimons & Brain, 1958 
 Genus Nucras:
 Nucras caesicaudata Broadley, 1972, blue-tail scrub lizard 
 Nucras holubi (Steindachner, 1882), Holub's sandveld lizard, syn. Nucras holubi 
 Nucras intertexta (A. Smith, 1838), spotted sandveld lizard, syn. Lacerta intertexta Smith, 1838 
 Nucras lalandii (Milne-Edwards, 1829), Laland's lizard, syn.  Lacerta lalandii Milne-Edwards, 1829, Lacerta delalandii Duméril & Bibron, 1839, Nucras delalandii Fitzsimons, 1992, endemic 
 Nucras livida (A. Smith, 1838), karoo sandveld lizard, syn. Nucras tessellata livida Smith, 1838 endemic 
 Nucras taeniolata (A. Smith, 1838), striped scrub lizard, syn. Nucras intertexta Fitzsimons & Brain, 1958, Eremias holubi Steindacher, 1882, Lacerta taeniolata Smith, 1838 endemic 
 Nucras taeniolata ornata (Gray, 1864), ornate sandveld lizard, syn. Teira ornata Gray, 1864, Nucras ornata Boycott, 1992 
 Nucras tessellata Smith, 1838, tiger lizard, syn. Lacerta tessellata Smith, 1838 
 Genus Pedioplanis:
 Pedioplanis burchelli (Duméril & Bibron, 1839), Burchell's sand lizard, syn. Eremias burchelli Duméril & Bibron, 1839, endemic 
 Pedioplanis inornata (Roux, 1907), plain sand lizard, syn. Pedioplanis undata inornata (Roux, 1907), Eremias inornata Roux, 1907, Eremias undata inornata Daan & Hillenius, 1966, endemic to southern Africa 
 Pedioplanis laticeps (A. Smith, 1849), karoo sand lizard, syn. Eremias burchelli Duméril 1839, Eremias laticeps Smith, 1849, Lacerta capensis Smith, 1838, Pedioplanis laticeps Makokha et al., 2007, endemic 
 Pedioplanis lineoocellata Duméril & Bibron, 1839, plain sand lizard, syn. Eremias inornata Roux 1907, Eremias undata inornata Daan 1966, Eremias lineo-ocellata Duméril & Bibron, 1839, Eremias formosa Smith, 1845, Eremias pulchra Smith, 1845, Eremias annulifera Smith, 1845, Eremias lineoocellata Duméril, 1839 
 Pedioplanis lineoocellata inocellata (Mertens, 1955), spotted sand lizard, syn. Eremias lineo-ocellata Duméril & Bibron, 1839 
 Pedioplanis lineoocellata lineoocellata (Duméril & Bibron, 1839), spotted sand lizard, syn. Eremias lineo-ocellata Duméril & Bibron, 1839n endemic to southern Africa 
 Pedioplanis lineoocellata pulchella Gray, 1845, spotted sand lizard, syn. Pedioplanis lineoocellata lineoocellata Auerbach, 1987, near endemic 
 Pedioplanis namaquensis (Duméril & Bibron, 1839), Namaqua sand lizard, syn. Eremias namaquensis Duméril & Bibron, 1839 
 Pedioplanis undata Smith, 1838, western sand lizard, syn. Lacerta undata Smith, 1838, Eremias undata Duméril & Bibron, 1839 
 Genus Tropidosaura:
 Tropidosaura cottrelli (Hewitt, 1925), Cottrell's mountain lizard, endemic 
 Tropidosaura essexi Hewitt, 1927, Essex's mountain lizard, endemic 
 Tropidosaura gularis Hewitt, 1927, Cape mountain lizard, endemic 
 Tropidosaura montana Duméril & Bibron, 1839, green-striped mountain lizard, endemic 
 Tropidosaura montana natalensis Fitzsimons, 1947 Natal mountain lizard, syn. Tropidosaura montana Duméril & Bibron 1839 endemic 
 Tropidosaura montana rangeri Hewitt, 1926 Ranger's mountain lizard, endemic 
 Tropidosaura montana montana (Gray, 1831), common mountain lizard, syn. Tropidosaura burchelli Smith, 1849, endemic 
 Genus Vhembelacerta:
 Vhembelacerta rupicola Fitzsimons 1933, Soutpansberg rock lizard, syn. Lacerta rupicola, endemic

Leptotyphlopidae  
Family Leptotyphlopidae 
 Genus Leptotyphlops:
 Leptotyphlops conjunctus incognitus Broadley, 2007, Incognito thread snake, syn. Glauconia conjuncta Gough 1908, Leptotyphlops conjuncta Fitzsimons 1939, Leptotyphlops conjunctus Broadley 1971, Leptotyphlops emini Bogert 1940, Leptotyphlops incognitus Broadley 2007, Leptotyphlops nigricans Manacas 1957, Leptotyphlops scutifrons Wilson 1965, Stenostoma nigricans Peters 1882 
 Leptotyphlops distanti Boulenger, 1892, Distant's thread snake, syn. Leptotyphlops conjunctus distanti Mertens, 1955, Leptotyphlops conjuncta distanti Bogert, 1940, Glauconia distanti Boulenger in Distant, 1892, near endemic 
 Leptotyphlops gracilior Boulenger, 1910, Slender thread snake, syn. Glauconia gracilior Boulenger, 1910, Namibiana gracilior (Boulenger, 1910), Glauconia gracilior' Boulenger, 1910, Leptotyphlops graciliar Isemonger 1962 
 Leptotyphlops nigricans (Schlegel, 1839), Black thread snake Leptotyphlops nigricans nigricans Broadley & Watson, 1976, Stenostoma nigricans Duméril & Bibron, 1844, Typhlops nigricans Schlegel, 1839, Glauconia nigricans Gray, 1845, Leptotyphlops nigricans Fitzinger, 1843, Leptotyphlops jacobseni Broadley & Broadley, 1999, endemic 
 Leptotyphlops occidentalis Fitzsimons, 1962, Western thread snake, syn. Namibiana occidentalis (Fitzsimmons, 1962) 
 Leptotyphlops scutifrons (Peters, 1854), Peter's thread snake, syn. Stenostoma scutifrons Peters, 1854, Glauconia conjuncta Boulenger, 1893, Glauconia distanti Loveridge, 1923, Glauconia emini Sternfeld, 1912, Glauconia latifrons Sternfeld, 1910, Glauconia okahandjana Ahl, 1924, Glauconia scutifrons Boulenger, 1890, Glauconia signata Sternfeld, 1908, Leptotyphlops conjuncta Loveridge, 1933, Leptotyphlops conjuncta conjuncta Barbour & Loveridge, 1946, Leptotyphlops conjunctus Mcdiarmid et al., 1999, Leptotyphlops conjunctus conjunctus Laurent, 1956, Leptotyphlops distanti Barbour & Loveridge, 1928, Leptotyphlops emini emini Spawls, 1978, Leptotyphlops latifrons Broadley & Wallach, 2007, Leptotyphlops signatus Hahn, 1980, Stenostoma conjuncta Tornier, 1896, Leptotyphlops scutifrons scutifrons Broadley & Watson, 1976, Leptotyphlops scutifrons merkeri (Werner, 1909), Glauconia merkeri Werner, 1909, Stenostoma conjuncta Tornier, 1896, Glauconia distanti Loveridge, 1923, Glauconia emini Loveridge, 1916 
 Leptotyphlops scutifrons pitmani Broadley & Wallach 2007, Peter's thread snake, syn. Glauconia latifrons Sternfeld, 1908 
 Leptotyphlops scutifrons scutifrons (Peters, 1854), Peter's thread snake, syn. Glauconia scutifrons Boulenger, 1890 
 Leptotyphlops scutifrons merkeri (Werner, 1909), Peter's thread snake, syn. Glauconia merkeri Werner, 1909, Glauconia scutifrons Boulenger, 1893 
 Leptotyphlops sylvicolus Broadley & Wallach, 1997, forest thread snake, endemic 
 Genus Myriopholis:
 Myriopholis longicaudus (Peters, 1854), longtail blind snake, syn. Glauconia brevirostralis Fitzsimons, 1930, Glauconia fiechteri Scortecci, 1929, Glauconia longicauda Boulenger, 1890, Leptotyphlops fiechteri Parker, 1932, Leptotyphlops longicauda Loveridge, 1953, Stenostoma longicaudum Peters, 1854, Glauconia fiechteri Scortecci, 1929, Myriopholis longicauda Dalsteinsson, Branchm Trape, Vitt & Hedges, 2009

Pythonidae 
Family Pythonidae
 Genus Python:
 Python natalensis A. Smith, 1840, African rock python, syn. Python sebae natalensis Smith, 1840, Python saxuloides Miller & Smith, 1979, Python sebae Mcdiarmid, Campbell & Touré, 1999, endemic to the southern half of Africa

Scincidae  
Family Scincidae 
 Genus Acontias:
 Acontias bicolor Hewitt, 1929, Cregoe's legless skink, syn. Typhlosaurus cregoi bicolor Hewitt, 1929 
 Acontias breviceps Essex, 1925, shorthead lance skink, endemic 
 Acontias cregoi (Boulenger, 1903) Cregoe's legless skink, syn. Typhlosaurus cregoi Boulenger, 1903, near endemic 
 Acontias fitzsimonsi (Broadley, 1968) FitzSimon's legless skink, syn. Typhlosaurus aurantiacus fitzsimonsi Broadley, 1968, endemic 
 Acontias gariepensis (Fitzsimons, 1941) Mier Kalahari legless skink, FitzSimon's legless skink, syn. Typhlosaurus gariepensis Fitzsimons, 1941, endemic to southern Africa 
 Acontias gracilicauda Essex, 1925, thin-tailed legless skink, syn. Acontias gracilicauda (Essex, 1925), endemic 
 Acontias gracilicauda gracilicauda Essex, 1925, slendertail lance skink, syn. Acontias gracilicauda Daniels et al., 2005, endemic 
 Acontias gracilicauda namaquensis Hewitt, 1938 Namaqua lance skink, endemic 
 Acontias grayi Boulenger, 1887, striped legless skink, Gray dwarf legless skink, syn. Acontias lineatus Peters, 1879 endemic 
 Acontias kgalagadi subtaeniatus (Broadley, 1887), striped legless skink, syn. Typhlosaurus lineatus lineatus Boulenger, 1887, Typhlosaurus lineatus subtaeniatus Broadley, 1887, endemic 
 Acontias lineatus Peter, 1879, striped dwarf legless skink, syn. Microacontias lineatus (Peters, 1879) endemic 
 Acontias lineicauda Hewitt, 1937 Algoa leglesss skink endemic 
 Acontias litoralis Broadly & Greer, 1969, coastal dwarf legless skink, Broadley's lance skink, syn. Microacontias litoralis (Broadley & Greer 1969), endemic 
 Acontias meleagris (Linnaeus, 1758), Cape legless skink, Linnaeus' lance skink, syn. Anguis meleagris Linnaeus, 1758, endemic 
 Acontias meleagris meleagris (Linnaeus, 1758), Linnaeus' lance skink, syn. Acontias meleagris Linnaeus, 1758 endemic 
 Acontias namaquensis Hewitt, 1938 Namaqua lance skink, syn. Acontias gracilicauda namaquensis Hewitt, 1938, endemic 
 Acontias orientalis (Hewitt, 1938) Namaqua lance skink, syn. Acontias meleagris orientalis Hewitt, 1938 endemic 
 Acontias parietalis (Broadley, 1990) Maputaland legless skink, syn. Acontias aurantiacus parietalis Broadley, 1990 endemic to southern Africa 
 Acontias percivali Loveridge, 1935, Percival's lance skink 
 Acontias percivali percivali Loveridge, 1935 Percival's lance skink, syn. Acontias percivali Loveridge, 1935 
 Acontias percivali occidentalis Fitzsimmons, 1941, Percival's lance skink, syn. Acontias percivali 
 Acontias percivali tasmani Hewitt, 1938, Percival's lance skink, syn. Acontias percivali occidentalis 
 Acontias plumbeus Bianconi, 1849, giant lance skink, syn. Acontias plumbeus Bianconi, 1849, Acontias niger Peters, 1854 
 Acontias poecilus Bourquin & Lambiris, 1996, variable legless skink, syn. Acontias poecilus Bourquin & Lambiris, 1996, endemic 
 Acontias richardi (Jacobsen, 1987) Richard's legless skink, syn. Typhlosaurus lineatus richardi Jacobsen, 1987, endemic 
 Acontias rieppeli Lamb, Biswas & Bauer, 2010, wood-bush legless skink, syn. Acontophiops lineatus Sternfeld, 1911, Typhlosaurus rieppeli Welch, 1982, Acontophiops lineatus Branch, 1988, Acontophiops lineatus Daniels et al., 2006, endemic 
 Genus Afroablepharus:
 Afroablepharus maculicollis (Jacobsen & Broadley, 2000), spotted-neck snake-eyed skink, endemic to southern half of Africa 
 Afroablepharus wahlbergii (A. Smith, 1849), Wahlberg's snake-eyed skink, endemic to sub-Saharan Africa
 Genus Lygosoma:
 Lygosoma afrum Peters, 1854, Peters' eyelid skink, syn. Lygosoma afer Greer et al. 1985, Eumeces afer Peters, 1854, Eumeces perdicicolor Cope, 1868, Euprepes (Senira) dumerili Steindacher, 1870, Lygosoma sundevalli Schmidt, 1919, Mochlus afer Bocage, 1867, Mochlus punctulatus Günther, 1864 
 Genus Mochlus:
 Mochlus sundevalli (Smith, 1849), Sundevall’s writhing skink, syn. Eumices (Riopa) sunderallii Smith, 1849, Eumeces reticulatus Peters, 1862, Sepacontias modestus Günther, 1880, Lygosoma modestum Boulenger, 1895, Sepacontias modestus Günther, 1895, Lygosoma laeviceps modestum Sternfeld, 1912, Riopa sundevalli Smith, 1937, Riopa modesta modesta Mertens, 1938, Lygosoma sundevalli sundevalli Auerbach, 1987, Lygosoma sundevalli modestum Lanza, 1988 
 Genus Panaspis:
 Panaspis maculilabris Jacobson & Broadley, 2000, endemic 
 Panaspis wahlbergii Smith, 1849, Wahlberg's snake-eyed skink, syn. Ablepharus wahlbergi Loveridge, 1957, Afroablepharus wahlbergi Greer, 1974, Afroblepharus wahlbergi Auerbach, 1987, Cryptoblepharus wahlbergi Smith, 1849, Panaspis wahlbergii Boycott, 1992 
 Genus Scelotes:
 Scelotes anguinus (Boulenger, 1887), Algoa dwarf burrowing skink, syn. Herpetoseps anguinus Boulenger, 1887, Herpetosaura anguinea Tornier, 1902, endemic 
 Scelotes arenicola (Peters, 1854), Zululand dwarf burrowing skink, syn. Scelotes arenicola Boulenger, 1887, Scelotes arenicola arenicola Broadley, 1990, Scelotes arenicola Greer, 1970, Herpetosaura arenicola Peters, 1854 Near endemic 
 Scelotes arenicolus arenicolus (Peters, 1854), syn. Herpetosaura arenicola Tornier, 1902 
 Scelotes arenicolus insularis Broadley, 1990, syn. Scelotes arenicola Boulenger, 1887 
 Scelotes bicolor (Smith, 1849), two-colored burrowing skink, syn. Lithophilus bicolor Smith, 1849, Scelotes arenicola (Branch & Bauer, 2005), endemic 
 Scelotes bidigittatus Fitzsimons, 1930, lowveld dwarf burrowing skink, syn. Herpetosaura bidigittata Witte & Laurent, 1943, Scelotes bidigittata Greer, 1970 endemic 
 Scelotes bipes (Linnaeus, 1766), common burrowing skink, syn. Anguis bipes Linnaeus, 1766, Scelotes linnaei Duméril & Bibron, 1839 endemic 
 Scelotes caffer (Peters, 1861), Peters' burrowing skink, syn. Sepomorphus caffer Peters, 1861, endemic 
 Scelotes capensis A. Smith, 1849, Cape burrowing skink, syn. Gongylus capensis Smith, 1849, Seps capensis Günther, 1871, Sepsina weberi Roux, 1907, endemic 
 Scelotes duttoni Broadley, 1990 
 Scelotes gronovii (Daudin, 1802), Gronovi's dwarf burrowing skink, syn. Seps gronovii Daudin, 1802, endemic 
 Scelotes guentheri Boulenger, 1887, Günther's burrowing skink, syn. Herpetosaura inornata Günther, 1873, Herpetosaura guentheri Witte & Laurent, 1943, endemic 
 Scelotes inornatus Smith, 1849, Smith's dwarf burrowing skink, syn. Herpetosaura inornata Günther, 1873, Lithophilus inornatus Smith, 1849, Scelotes brevipes Visser, 1984, Scelotes inonatus Boulenger, 1887, Scelotes inornata Greer, 1970, Scelotes inornatus Broadley, 1994, Scelotes inornatus inornatus Fitzsimons, 1943, Scelotes natalensis Hewitt, 1921, endemic 
 Scelotes kasneri Fitzsimons, 1939, Kasner's burrowing skink endemic 
 Scelotes limpopoensis Fitzsimons, 1930, Limpopo burrowing skink, endemic 
 Scelotes limpopoensis albiventris Jacobsen, 1987, white-bellied dwarf burrowing skink, syn. Scelotes limpopoensis Fitzsimons 1930, endemic 
 Scelotes limpopoensis limpopoensis Fitzsimons, 1930, Limpopo dwarf burrowing skink 
 Scelotes mirus (Roux, 1907), montane dwarf burrowing skink, syn. Herpetosaura mira Roux, 1907, Scelotes mira Hewitt, 1921, endemic 
 Scelotes montispectus Bauer et al., 2003, Bloubergstrand dwarf burrowing skink, endemic 
 Scelotes mossambicus (Peters, 1882), Mozambique dwarf burrowing skink, syn. Herpetosaura arenicola Bocage, 1882, Herpetosaura brevipes Witte & Laurent, 1943, Herpetosaura inornata Witte & Laurent, 1943, Herpetosaura inornata mossambica Peters, 1882, Scelotes arenicola Bocage, 1896, Scelotes brevipes Hewitt, 1925, Scelotes guentheri Ohdner, 1908, Scelotes inornatus inornatus Visser, 1984, Scelotes inornatus mossambicus Bruton & Haacke, 1980, near endemic 
 Scelotes sexlineatus Harlan, 1824, striped dwarf burrowing skink, syn. Seps sexlineatus Boulenger, 1887, Scelotes bipes sexlineatus Welch, 1982, endemic 
 Scelotes vestigifer Broadley, 1994, coastal dwarf burrowing skink, syn. Scelotes arenicola Bruton & Haacke, 1980, near endemic 
 Genus Trachylepis:
 Trachylepis acutilabris Peters, 1862, sharp-lipped mabuya, syn. Euprepes acutilabris Peters, 1862, Euprepis acutilabris Mausfeld et al., 2002, Mabuya acutilabris Schmidt, 1919 
 Trachylepis capensis (Gray, 1831), Cape three-lined skink, syn. Euprepis capensis Mausfeld et al., 2002, Herinia capensis Gray, 1839, Mabuya capensis Fitzsimons, 1943, Scincus trivittatus Cuvier, 1829, Tiliqua capensis Gray, 1831, Trachylepis capensis Bauer, 2003, endemic to southern parts of Africa 
 Trachylepis depressa (Peters, 1854), eastern coastal skink, syn. Euprepes depressus Peters, 1854, Euprepis depressus Mausfeld et al., 2002, Mabuya depressa Broadley, 2000, Mabuya homalocephala depressa Branch, 1988 endemic to southern Africa 
 Trachylepis homalocephala (Wiegmann, 1828), Red-sided skink, syn. Euprepes depressus Peters, 1854, Euprepis homalocephalus Mausfeld et al., 2002, Lacerta punctata Linnaeus, 1758, Mabuia homalocephala Boulenger, 1887, Mabuya homalocephala smithii Fitzsimons, 1943, Mabuya maculata (Gray, 1845), Mabuya punctata Anderson, 1900, Scincus homolocephalus Gray, 1831, Scincus homolocephalus [sic] Wiegmann, 1828, Trachylepis homalocephala Bauer, 2003, Mabuya homalocephala Branch, 1998, endemic 
 Trachylepis margaritifer (Peters, 1854), rainbow skink, syn. Euprepes margaritifer Peters, 1854, Euprepis margaritiferus Mausfeld et al., 2002, Mabuya margaritifer Cooper, 2005, Mabuya margaritifera Broadley & Bauer, 1999, Mabuya obsti Werner, 1913, Mabuya quinquetaeniata margaritifer Broadley & Howell, 1991, Mabuya quinquetaeniata obsti Loveridge, 1936, Trachylepis margaritifera Peters 1854, endemic to Africa 
 Trachylepis occidentalis (Peters, 1867), western three-striped skink, syn. Euprepes occidentalis Peters, 1867, Euprepes vittatus australis Peters, 1862, Euprepis occidentalis Mausfeld et al., 2002, Mabuia calaharica Werner, 1910, Mabuya occidentalis Fitzsimons & Brain, 1958, endemic to Africa 
 Trachylepis punctatissima (A. Smith, 1849), montane speckled skink, syn. Euprepes (Euprepis) grützneri Peters, 1869, Euprepes puntatissimus Smith, 1849, Euprepes sunderalli Smith, 1849, Euprepis punctatissima Mausfeld et al., 2003, Mabuya punctatissima Broadley, 2000, Mabuya striata Fitzsimons, 1943, Mabuya striata punctassima Broadley, 1977, Mabuya striata punctassimus Bauer et al., 1995, endemic to southern half of Africa 
 Trachylepis punctulata (Bocage, 1872), speckled sand skink, syn. Euprepes punctulatus Bocage, 1872, Mabuya damarana Fitsimons, 1943, Mabuya longiloba triebneri Mertens, 1954, Mabuya variegata Broadley, 1971, Mabuya variegata punctulata Broadley, 1975, Mabuya punctulata Broadley, 2000, Euprepis punctulatus Mausfeld et al., 2002, endemic to southern half of Africa 
 Trachylepis quinquetaeniata (Lichtenstein, 1823), rainbow skink, syn. Scincus quinquetaeniatus Lichtenstein 1823, Mabuya quinquetaeniata Fitzinger, 1826,  Euprepes savignyi Duméril & Bibron, 1839, Trachylepis savignyi Fitzinger, 1843,  Eupressis quinquetaeniatus Blanford, 1870, Euprepes quinquetaeniatus Boettger, 1880, Mabuia quinquetaeniata scharica Sternfeld, 1917,  Mabuia albilabris Chabanaud, 1917, Mabuia semicollaris Werner, 1917, Mabuya quinquetaeniata quinquetaeniata Loveridge, 1936, Trachylepis quinquetaeniata Bauer, 2003 
 Trachylepis quinquetaeniata langheldi (Sternfeld, 1917), rainbow skink, syn. Trachylepis quinquetaeniata langheldi (Sternfeld, 1917), Mabuya quinquetaeniata langheldi Sternfeld, Mabuya langheldi Böhme, 1985 
 Trachylepis quinquetaeniata riggenbachi (Sternfeld, 1910) African five-lined skink, syn. Trachylepis quinquetaeniata riggenbachi (Sternfeld, 1910), Mabuya riggenbachi Bauer et al., 2003 
 Trachylepis spilogaster Peters, 1882, spiny mabuya, syn. Euprepes (Euprepis) striatus spilogaster Peters, 1882, Mabuya spilogaster Bradley, 1969, Mabuya striata Fitzsimons, 1943, Mabuya striata spilogaster Mertens, 1955, Euprepes (Euprepis) striatus Peters, 1882, Euprepes (Euprepis) spilogaster Mausfeld, 2002 
 Trachylepis striata wahlbergii (Peters, 1869), Wahlberg's skink, syn. Mabuya striata wahlbergi, endemic 
 Trachylepis striata Peters, 1884, striped skink, syn. Tropidolepisma striatum Peters, 1844, Euprepes punctatissimus Peters, 1854, Euprepes wahlbergi Peters, 1870, Euprepis grantii Gray, 1864, Euprepis striatus Mausfeld et al., 2002, Mabouia striata Günther, 1895, Mabuya ellenbergeri Chabanaud, 1917, Mabuya striata Fitzsimons, 1943, Mabuya striata ellenbergeri Loveridge, 1953, Mabuya striata striata Loveridge, 1953, Mabuya striata wahlbergi Broadley, 1971, Mabuya wahlbergi Broadley, 2000, Trachylepis striata striata (Peters, 1844), Trachylepis striata wahlbergi (Peters, 1869), Mabuia striata Boulenger, 1895, endemic to Africa 
 Trachylepis striata striata (Peters, 1844), African striped mabuya, syn. Mabuya striata Fitzsimons & Bain, 1958 
 Trachylepis striata wahlbergi (Peters, 1869), African striped mabuya, syn. Mabuia striata Boulenger, 1895 
 Trachylepis sulcata sulcata Peters, 1867, western rock skink, syn. Euprepes olivaceus Peters, 1862, Euprepes sulcatus Peters, 1867, Mabuya sulcata (Peters, 1867), Euprepis sulcatus Mausfeld, 2002, endemic 
 Trachylepis varia (Peters, 1867), variable skink, syn. Euprepes (Euprepis) isselii Peters, 1871, Euprepes (Euprepis) varius Peters, 1867, Euprepes (Mabuya) laevigatus Peters, 1869, Euprepes damaranus Peters, 1870, Euprepes varius Fischer, 1884, Mabuia varia Boulenger, 1895, Mabuya damarana Fitzsimons & Bain, 1958, Mabuya varia Auerbach, 1987, Mabuya varia damaranus Loveridge, 1936, Mabuya varia nyikae Loveridge, 1953, Mabuya varia varia Loveridge, 1936, Euprepis varius Mausfeld, 2002, endemic to Africa 
 Trachylepis variegata (Peters, 1870), variegated skink, syn. Euprepes variegatus Peters, 1870, Mabuia varia longiloba Methuen & Hewitt, 1914, Mabuya damarana Fitzsimons, 1943, Mabuya longiloba longiloba Mertens, 1955, Mabuya variegata Greer et al., 2000, Mabuya variegata variegata Broadley, 1975, Euprepis variegatus Mausfeld, 2002, endemic to southern Africa
 Genus Typhlacontias:
 Typhlacontias johnsonii Anderson, 1916, endemic 
 Genus Typhlosaurus:
 Typhlosaurus aurantiacus Peters, 1854, Typhline aurantiaca Peters, 1854, Acontias aurantiacus (Peters, 1854) 
 Typhlosaurus aurantiacus bazarutoensis Broadley, 1990, syn. Acontias aurantiacus bazarutoensis Broadley, 1990 
 Typhlosaurus aurantiacus aurantiacus (Peters, 1854), Typhlosaurus aurantiacus Bauer et al., 1995, Acontias aurantiacus aurantiacus (Peters, 1854) 
 Typhlosaurus aurantiacus carolinensis Broadley, 1990, syn. Acontias aurantiacus carolinensis Broadley, 1990 
 Typhlosaurus caecus (Cuvier, 1816 [1817]), Cuvier's legless skink, syn. Acontias caecus Cuvier, 1817, Typhline cuvierii Duméril & Bibron, 1839, endemic 
 Typhlosaurus cregoi cregoi Boulenger, 1903, Cregoe's legless skink, syn. Typhlosaurus cregoi Boulenger, 1903 
 Typhlosaurus lineatus Boulenger, 1887, striped legless skink, syn. Acontias kgalagadi Lamb, Biswas & Bauer, 2010, endemic to southern Africa 
 Typhlosaurus lineatus lineatus Boulenger, 1887, striped legless skink, syn. Typhlosaurus lineatus Boulenger, 1887 
 Typhlosaurus lomiae Haacke, 1986 Lomi's blind legless skink, syn. Typhlosaurus lomii Haacke, 1986, endemic 
 Typhlosaurus meyeri Boettger, 1894, Meyer's legless skink, syn. Typhlosaurus plowesi Fitzsimons, 1943
 Typhlosaurus vermis Boulenger, 1887 Boulenger's legless skink

Typhlopidae  
Family Typhlopidae
 Genus Afrotyphlops:
 Afrotyphlops bibronii (A. Smith, 1846), Bibron's blind snake, syn. Onychocephalus bibronii Smith, 1846, Afrotyphlops bibronii (Smith, 1846), near endemic 
 Afrotyphlops fornasinii (Bianconi, 1849), Fornasini's blind snake, syn. Afrotyphlops fornasinii Bianconi, 1847, Onychocephalus trilobus Peters, 1854, Onychocephalus mossambicus Peters, 1854, Onychocephalus tettensis Peters, Typhlops bianconii Jan, in Jan & Sordelli, 1860, Typhlops mossambicus Boulenger, 1893, Typhlops tettensis Boulenger, 1893, endemic to southern Africa 
 Genus Megatyphlops:
 Megatyphlops mucruso (Peter, 1854), Zambezi giant blind snake, syn. Onychocephalus mucruso Peter, 1854 
 Megatyphlops schlegelii (Bianconi, 1847), Schlegel's giant blind snake, syn. Typhlops schlegelii Bianconi, 1847, Onychocephalus petersii Bocage, 1873, Rhinotyphlops brevis Spawls et al., 2001, Typhlops (Onychocephalus) humbo Bocage, 1886, Typhlops brevis Scortecci, 1929, Typhlops hottentotus Bocage, 1893, Typhlops humbo Boulenger, 1893, Typhlops schlegelii brevis Parker, 1949, Typhlops schlegelii schlegelii Loveridge, 1933, Megatyphlops schlegelii (Bianconni, 1847), Megatyphlops schlegelii schlegelii (Peters 1860), Onychocephalus schlegelii Peters, 1860, Rhinotyphlops schlegelii schlegelii Roux-Estève, 1974, Megatyphlops schlegelii petersii (Bocage, 1873), Typhlops humbo Boulenger, 1893, Rhinotyphlops schlegelii petersii Roux-Estève, 1974, endemic to the southern half of Africa 
 Genus Ramphotyphlops:
 Ramphotyphlops braminus (Daudin, 1803) Brahminy blind snake, syn. Argyrophis bramicus Kelaart, 1854, Argyrophis truncatus Gray, 1845, Eryx braminus Daudin, 1803, Glauconia braueri Sternfeld, 1910, Onychocephalus capensis Smith, 1846, Ophthalmidium tenue Hallowell, 1861, Tortrix russelii Merrem, 1820, Typhlina braminus McDowell, 1974, Typhlops braminus Duméril, 1844, Typhlops limbrickii Annandale, 1906, Typhlops pseudosaurus Dryden, 1969, Typhlops russeli Schlegel, 1839, Typhlops (Typhlops) euproctus Boettger, 1882, Typhlops (Typhlops) inconspicuus Jan, 1863, endemic 
 Genus Rhinotyphlops:
 Rhinotyphlops boylei Fitzsimons, 1932, Boyle's beaked blind snake, syn. Typhlops boylei Fitzsimons, 1932 
 Rhinotyphlops lalandei (Schlegel, 1839), Delalande's beaked blind snake, syn. Onychophis delalandii Duméril & Bibron, 1844, Onychophis fordii Gray, 1845, Onychophis franklinii Gray, 1845, Onychophis lalandeii Gray, 1845, Typhlops (Onychocephalus) delalandei Boettger, 1887, Typhlops delalandei paucisquamata Boettger, 1898, Typhlops delalandi Boulenger, 1887, Typhlops lalandei Schlegel, 1839, Typhlops lalandei paucisquamosa Boettger, 1883, Typhlops smithi Jan (in Jan & Sordelli), 1860, endemic to southern Africa 
 Rhinotyphlops schinzi (Boettger, 1887), Schinz's beaked blind snake, syn. Typhlops (Onychocephalus) schinzi Boettger, 1887, Typhlops schinzi Boulenger, 1893, endemic
 Rhinotyphlops schlegelii petersii (Bocage, 1873), Peters' giant blind snake, syn. Rhinotyphlops schlegelii schlegelii (Peters 1860), Onychocephalus petersii Bocage, 1873, Typhlops hottentotus Bocage 1893 
 Rhinotyphlops schlegelii brevis (Scortecci, 1929), Schlegel's giant blind snake, syn. Rhinotyphlops schlegelii Mcdiarmid, Campbell & Touré, 1999, Rhinotyphlops brevis Spawls et al., 2001, Typhlops brevis Scortecci, 1929, Typhlops schlegelii brevis Parker, 1949 
 Rhinotyphlops schlegelii schlegelii (Peters, 1860), Schlegel's giant blind snake, syn. Typhlops schlegelii Boulenger, 1893, Typhlops schlegelii schlegelii Loveridge, 1933, Onychocephalus schlegelii Peters 1860 
 Genus Typhlops:
 Typhlops obtusus Peters, 1865, Southern gracile blind-snake, syn. Letheobia obtusa (Peters, 1865), Typhlops (Onychocephalus) obtusus Peters, 1865, Typhlops tettensis obtusus Loveridge, 1953, Typhlops obtusus obtusus Laurent, 1968, Typhlops obtusus palgravei Laurent, 1968, Lethobia obtusa (Peters, 1865)

Varanidae 
Family Varanidae
 Genus Varanus:
 Varanus albigularis Daudin, 1802, white-throated monitor lizard, syn. Varanus albigularis albigularis Daudin, 1802, Regenia albogularis Günther, 1861, Varanus (Polydaedalus) albigularis Böhme, 2002, Varanus exanthematicus albigularis Schmidt, 1919, Varanus exanthematicus angolensis Mertens, 1937, Varanus exanthematicus ionidesi Laurent, 1964, Varanus exanthematicus microstictus Mertens, 1942, Varanus microstictus Boettger, 1893, Monitor albigularis Gray, 1831, Monitor exanthematicus capensis Schlegel, 1844, Monitor exanthematicus capensis Schelgel, 1844,  Tupinambis albigularis Daudin, 1802, Varanus albogularis Dumeril, 1836, Varanus gilli Smith, 1831
 Varanus albigularis albigularis (Daudin, 1802), rock monitor		
 Varanus albigularis angolensis Schmidt, 1933, rock monitor, syn. Varanus exanthematicus angolensis Mertens, 1937	
 Varanus albigularis ionidesi Laurent, 1964, rock monitor, syn. Varanus exanthematicus ionidesi Laurent, 1964	
 Varanus albigularis microstictus Boettger, 1893, rock monitor, syn. Varanus exanthematicus microstictus Mertens, 1942, Varanus microstictus Boettger, 1893	
 Varanus niloticus (Linnaeus, 1758), Nile monitor, syn. Lacerta capensis Sparrman, 1783, Lacerta monitor Linnaeus, 1758, Lacerta nilotica Linnaeus, 1766, Lacertus tupinambis Lacépède, 1788, Monitor niloticus Lichtenstein, 1818, Monitor pulcher Leach in Bowdich, 1819, Stellio saurus Laurenti, 1768, Tupinambis elegans Daudin, 1802, Tupinambis stellatus Daudin, 1802, Varanus (Polydaedalus) niloticus Mertens, 1942, Monitor elegans senegalensis Schlegel, 1844

Viperidae 
Family Viperidae
 Genus Bitis:
 Bitis albanica Hewitt, 1937, Albany adder, syn. Bitis cornuta albanica Hewitt, 1937	Endemic
 Bitis arietans Merrem, 1820, puff adder, syn. Bitis arietans arietans (Merrem, 1820), Cobra clotho Laurenti, 1768, Echidna arietans Duméril & Bibron, 1854 (1425), Cobra lachesis Mertens, 1938, Bitis (Bitis) arietans Lenk et al., 1999, Vipera (Echidna) arietans Merrem, 1820, Bitis lachesis somalica Parker, 1949, Bitis arietans somalica Parker, 1949
 Bitis arietans arietans (Merrem, 1820), puff adder, syn. Vipera (Echidna) arietans arietans (Merrem, 1820)	
 Bitis arietans somaliaca Parker, 1949, puff adder, syn. Cobra lachesis Laurenti, 1768, Bitis lachesis somalica Parker, 1949	
 Bitis armata Smith, 1826, southern adder, syn. Vipera armata Smith, 1826, Vipera (Echidna) atropoides Smith, 1846, Bitis inornata Boulenger, 1896, Bitis cornuta cornuta Fitzsimons, 1962, Bitis cornuta inornata Underwood, 1968, Bitis atropoides Branch, 1997, Vipera armata Branch, 1999, endemic
 Bitis atropos Linnaeus, 1758, mountain adder, syn. Coluber atropos Linnaeus, 1758, Bitis (Calechidna) atropos Lenk et al., 1999, Vipera montana Smith, 1826, Echidna atropos Duméril & Bibron, 1854	
 Bitis atropos atropos (Linnaeus, 1758), mountain adder, syn. Vipera montana Smith, 1826, near endemic
 Bitis atropos unicolor, mountain adder, syn. Echidna atropos Duméril & Bibron, 1854 	
 Bitis caudalis (A. Smith, 1839), horned adder, syn. Vipera ocellata Smith, 1838, Vipera (Cerastes) caudalis Duméril & Bibron, 1854, Bitis (Calechidna) caudalis Lenk et al. 1999
 Bitis cornuta (Daudin, 1803), many-horned adder, syn. Vipera cornuta Daudin, 1803, Vipera lophophris Cuvier, 1829, Cerastes cornuta Gray, 1842, Clotho cornuta Gray, 1849, Cerastes lophophrys Duméril & Bibron, 1854, Cobra cornuta Mertens, 1937, Bitis cornuta cornuta Bogert, 1940, Bitis (Calechidna) cornuta Lenk et al., 1999, Vipera lophophrys Wagler, 1830, endemic to southwestern Africa
 Bitis gabonica (Duméril, Bibron & Duméril, 1854), Gabbon adder, syn. Bitis gabonica gabonica (Duméril, Bibron & Duméril, 1854), Urobelus gabonica (Lebreton, 1999), Bitis (Macrocerastes) gabonica Lenk et al., 1999, Vipera rhinoceros Schlegel, 1855, Echidna rhinoceros Duméril, 1856, Clotho rhinoceros Cope, 1859, Bitis rhinoceros Peters, 1882, Cerastes nasicornis Hallowell, 1847, Echidna gabonica Duméril, Bibron & Duméril, 1854, Bitis gabonica rhinoceros (Schlegel, 1855), Bitis rhinoceros Peters, 1882	
 Bitis gabonica gabonica (Duméril, Bibron & Duméril 1854), Gabbon adder, syn. Cerastes nasicornis Hallowell, 1847	
 Bitis gabonica rhinoceros (Schlegel, 1855), Gabbon adder, syn. Echidna gabonica Duméril, Bibron & Duméril, 1854, Bitis rhinoceros, endemic
 Bitis inornata (A. Smith, 1838), hornless adder, syn. Echidna inornata Smith, 1838, Clotho atropos Gray, 1849, Vipera inornata Strauch, 1869, Bitis cornuta inornata Underwood, 1968, Bitis (Calechidna) inornata Lenk et al., 1999, endemic
 Bitis rubida Branch, 1997, red adder, syn. Bitis cornuta albanica Hewitt, 1937, Bitis inornata Fitzsimmons, 1946, Bitis cornuta inornata Underwood, 1968, Bitis cornuta cornuta Haacke, 1975, Bitis caudalis Visser, 1979, Bitis (Calechidna) rubida Lenk et al., 1999, endemic
 Bitis schneideri (Boettger, 1886), Namaqua dwarf adder, syn. Vipera schneideri Boettger, 1886, Bitis caudalis paucisquamata Mertens, 1954, Bitis paucisquamata Mertens, 1954, Bitis (Calechidna) schneideri Lenk et al., 1999, endemic to southern Africa
 Bitis xeropaga Haacke, 1975, desert mountain adder, syn. Bitis (Calechidna) xeropaga Lenk et al., 1999, endemic to South Africa and Namibia
 Genus Causus:
 Causus defilippii (Jan, 1862), snouted night adder, Heterodon defilippi Jan, 1862
 Causus rhombeatus (Lichtenstein, 1823), common night adder, syn. Sepedon rhombeata Lichtenstein, 1823

Testudines 
Order Testudines

Cheloniidae 
Family Cheloniidae 
 Genus Caretta:
 Caretta caretta Linnaeus, 1758, loggerhead turtle, syn. Testudo caretta Linnaeus, 1758, Caouana elongata Gray, 1844, Caretta atra Merrem, 1820, Caretta gigas Deraniyagala, 1933, Caretta nasuta Rafinesque, 1814, Cephalochelys oceanica Gray, 1873, Chelonia caouana Duméril & Bibron, 1835, Chelonia caretta Dyce, 1861, Chelonia dubia Bleeker, 1889, Chelonia multiscutata Kuhl, 1820, Chelonia pelasgorum Bory, 1833, Chelonia polyaspis Bleeker, 1889, Testudo cephalo Schneider, 1783, Testudo corianna Gray, 1831, Thalassiochelys tarapacona Philippi, 1887, Thalassochelys caretta Boulenger, 1886, Thalassochelys cephalo Barbour & Cole, 1906, Thalassochelys controversa Philippi, 1899, Thalassochelys corticata Girand, 1858, Testudo marina Garsault, 1764, Testudo nasicornis Lacépède, 1788, Caouana elongata Gray, 1844, Thalassochelys cauana Boettger, 1880 
 Genus Chelonia:
 Chelonia mydas (Linnaeus, 1758), green turtle, syn. Chelonia mydas mydas (Linnaeus, 1758), Chelonia agassizii Bocourt, 1868, Testudo mydas Linnaeus, 1758, Chelonia mydas agassizii Bocourt, 1868 
 Genus Eretmochelys:
 Eretmochelys imbricata (Linnaeus, 1766), hawksbill turtle, syn. Chelone imbricata Boulenger, 1889, Chelonia imbricata Duméril, 1835, Chelonia radiata Cuvier, 1829, Testudo imbricata Linnaeus, 1766 
 [Eretmochelys imbricata bissa (Rüppell, 1835), hawksbill turtle, syn. Caretta bissa Rüppell 1835, Caretta rostrata Girard 1858, Caretta squamata Swinhoe 1863, Caretta squamosa Giraard 1858, Eretmochelys squamata Agassiz 1857, Eretmochelys squamosa Steineger 1907 
 Eretmochelys imbricata imbricata (Linnaeus, 1766), hawksbill turtle, syn. Chelonia pseudocaretta Lesson 1834, Chelonia pseudomydas Lesson 1834, Eretmochelys imbricata Conant 1991, Onychochelys kraussi Gray 1873 
 Genus Lepidochelys:
 Lepidochelys olivacea (Eschscholtz, 1829), olive Ridley turtle, syn. Caouana dessumierii Smith, 1849, Caouana olivacea Gray, 1844, Caouana rüppelli Gray, 1844, Caretta caretta olivacea Smith, 1931, Caretta olivacea Rüppell, 1835, Caretta remivaga Hay, 1908, Chelonia dussumierii Duméril, 1835, Chelonia olivacea Eschscholtz, 1829, Chelonia subcarinata Rüppell, 1844, Lepidochelys dussumierii Girard, 1858, Thalssochelys olivacea Strauch, 1862

Dermochelyidae 
Family Dermochelyidae
 Genus Dermochelys:
 Dermochelys coriacea (Vandelli, 1761), leatherback turtle, syn. Chelonia lutaria Rafinesque, 1814, Dermatochelys coriacea Günther, 1864, Dermatochelys porcata Wagler, 1830, Dermochelis atlantica, Lesueur, 1829, Sphargis angusta Philippi, 1899, Sphargis coriacea Gray, 1831, Sphargis coriacea schlegelii Garman, 1884, Sphargis mercurialis Merrem, 1820, Testudo arcuata Catesby, 1771, Testudo coriacea Vandelli, 1761, Testudo lyra Lacépède, 1788, Testudo tuberculata Pennant, 801
 Dermochelys coriacea  coriacea  (Vandelli, 1761), leatherback turtle	
 Dermochelys coriacea  schlegeli (Garman, 1884), leatherback turtle

Pelomedusidae 
Family Pelomedusidae
 Genus Pelomedusa:
 Pelomedusa subrufa Bonnaterre 1789, marsh terrapin, helmeted terrapin, syn. Testudo subrufa Lacépède, 1788, Emys olivacea Schweigger, 1812, Pelomedusa galeata Boulenger, 1889, Pelomedusa galeata damarensis Hewitt, 1935, Pelomedusa galeata devilliersi Hewitt, 1935, Pelomedusa galeata orangensis Hewitt, 1935, Pelomedusa galeata var. disjuncta Vaillant & Grandidier, 1910, Pelomedusa gasconi Rochebrune, 1884, Pelomedusa mossambicensis Peters (in Lichtenstein), 1856, Pelomedusa mozambica Peters (in Gray), 1855, Pelomedusa nigra Gray, 1863, Pelomedusa subrufa wettsteini Mertens, 1937, Pentonix americana Cornalia, 1849, Pentonyx capensis Duméril & Bibron, 1835, Pentonyx gehafie Rüppell, 1835, Testudo emys arabica Ehrenberg (in Stresemann), 1954, Testudo rubicunda Suckow, 1798
 Genus Pelusios:
 Pelusios rhodesianus Hewitt, 1927, variable hinged terrapin, syn. Pelusios nigricans rhodesianus Hewitt, 1927, Pelusios castaneus rhodesianus Wermuth & Mertens, 1977, Pelusios rhodesianus Broadley, 1998
 Pelusios sinuatus (A. Smith, 1838), serrated hinged terrapin, syn. Sternotherus sinuatus Smith, 1838, Sternotherus dentatus Peters, 1848, Sternothaerus sinuatus Boulenger, 1889, Sternothaerus bottegi Boulenger, 1895, Pelusios sinuatus zuluensis Hewitt, 1927, Pelusios sinuatus leptus Hewitt, 1933
 Pelusios castanoides Hewitt, 1931, yellow-bellied hinged terrapin, syn. Pelusios nigricans castanoides Hewitt, 1931, Pelusios castaneus kapika Bour, 1978, Pelusios castaneus castanoides Hewitt, 1931
 Pelusios subniger (Bonnaterre, 1789), Pan hinged terrapin

Testudinidae  
Family Testudinidae 
 Genus Chersina:
 Chersina angulata (Schweigger, 1812), angulate tortoise, syn. Testudo angulata Schweigger, 1812, Goniochersus angulata Lindholm, 1929, Neotestudo angulata Hewitt, 1931, near endemic 
 Genus Homopus:
 Homopus areolatus (Thunberg, 1787) parrot-beaked dwarf tortoise, syn. Testudo areolata Thunberg, 1787, Testudo miniata Lacépède, 1788, Testudo fasciata Daudin, 1802, Testudo africana Hermann, 1804, Chersine tetradactyla Merrem, 1820, Testudo areolata pallida Gray, 1831, endemic 
 Homopus boulengeri Duerden, 1906, Karoo dwarf tortoise, endemic 
 Homopus femoralis Boulenger, 1888, greater dwarf tortoise, endemic 
 Homopus signatus (Gmelin, 1789), speckled dwarf tortoise, speckled padloper, syn. Testudo signata Walbaum, 1782, Pseudomopus signatus peersi Hewitt, 1935, Testudo cafra Daudin, 1802, Testudo juvencella Daudin, 1831, endemic 
 Genus Kinixys:
 Kinixys belliana Gray, 1831, Bell's hinge-back tortoise, syn. Cinixys belliana Duméril & Bibron, 1835, Cinixys dorri Lataste, 1888, Homopus darlingi Boulenger, 1902, Kinixys australis Hewitt, 1931, Kinixys australis mababiensis Fitzsimons, 1932, Kinixys belliana domerguei (Vuillemin, 1972), Kinixys jordani Hewitt, 1931, Kinixys natalensis Hewitt, 1935, Kinixys schoensis Rüppell, 1845, Kinixys youngi Hewitt, 1931, Madakinixys domerguei Vuillemin, 1972, Kinixys belliana belliana (Gray, 1831), Kinixys belliana zuluensis Hewitt, 1931, Kinixys belliana domerguei (Vuillemin, 1972), Madakinixys domerguei Vuillemin, 1972, Kinixys belliana mertensi Laurent, 1956, Kinixys belliana nogueyi (Lataste, 1886), Homopus nogueyi Lataste, 1886, Cinixys dorri Lataste, 1888, Kinixys belliana zombensis Hewitt, 1931 
 Kinixys belliana mertensi Laurent, 1956, Bell's hinge-back tortoise, syn. Cinixys belliana Duméril & Bibron, 1835, endemic 
 Kinixys belliana belliana Gray, 1831, Bell's hinge-back tortoise, syn. Cinixys belliana Duméril & Bibron, 1835, Homopus darlingi Boulenger 1902, Kinixys australis Hewitt 1931, Kinixys australis mababiensis Fitzsimons 1932, Kinixys belliana zuluensis Hewitt 1931, Kinixys jordani Hewitt 1931, Kinixys natalensis Hewitt, 1935, Kinixys schoensis Rüppell 1845, Kinixys youngi Hewitt 1931 
 Kinixys lobatsiana Power, 1927, Lobatse hinge-back tortoise, syn. Kinixys belliana lobatsiana Auerbach, 1987, Cinixys lobatsiana Power 1927, near endemic 
 Kinixys natalensis Hewitt, 1935 Natal hinge-back tortoise, syn. Kinixys belliana natalensis Obst, 1986, near endemic 
 Kinixys spekii Gray, 1863 Speke's hinge-back tortoise, syn. Testudo procterae Loveridge, 1923, Kinixys belliana Wermuth & Mertens, 1977 
 Kinixys zombensis Hewitt, 1931 eastern hinged-back tortoise, syn. Cinixys belliana Duméril & Bibron, 1835 
 Genus Psammobates:
 Psammobates geometricus (Linnaeus, 1758) geometric tortoise, syn. Testudo geometrica Linnaeus, 1758, Testudo luteola Daudin, 1802, Testudo geometrica Duméril & Bibron, 1835, Peltastes geographicus Gray, 1869, Testudo strauchi Lidth De Jeude, 1893, endemic 
 Psammobates oculifer (Kuhl, 1820) serrated tortoise, syn. Testudo oculifera Kuhl, 1820, Testudo semiserrata Smith, 1840, Testudo semi-serrata Duméril & Bibron, 1854, Psammobates oculiferus King & Burke, 1989, endemic 
 Psammobates pardalis Bell, 1828 leopard tortoise, syn. Geochelone (Centrochelys) pardalis Bour, 1980, Geochelone pardalis babcocki Auerbach, 1987, Geochelone pardalis Vinke & Vinke, 2005, Psammobates pardalis babcocki (Loveridge, 1935), Psammobates pardalis Le et al., 2006, Psammobates pardalis pardalis (Bell, 1828), Testudo biguttata Cuvier, 1829, Testudo bipunctata Gray, 1831, Testudo pardalis babcocki Loveridge, 1935, Testudo pardalis Bell, 1828, Testudo pardalis pardalis Loveridge, 1935, Stigmochelys pardalis babcocki Loveridge, 1935, Stigmochelys pardalis pardalis Boue, 2002, Testudo armata Gray, 1831, Stigmochelys pardalis (Bell, 1828), endemic 
 Psammobates tentorius (Bell, 1828), tent tortoise, syn. Chersinella fiski colesbergensis Hewitt, 1934, Chersinella fiski cronwrighti Hewitt, 1934, Chersinella fiski grica Hewitt, 1934, Chersinella fiski gricoides Hewitt, 1934, Chersinella fiski orangensis Hewitt, 1934, Chersinella schonlandi Hewitt, 1934, Chersinella tentoria albanica Hewitt, 1933, Chersinella tentoria duerdeni Hewitt, 1933, Chersinella tentoria Hewitt, 1933, Chersinella tentoria karuella Hewitt, 1933, Chersinella tentoria karuica Hewitt, 1933, Chersinella tentoria lativittata Hewitt, 1933, Chersinella tentoria piscatella Hewitt, 1933, Chersinella tentoria subsulcata Hewitt, 1933, Chersinella tentoria tentorioides Hewitt, 1933, Chersinella verroxii amasensis Hewitt, 1934, Chersinella verroxii bergeri Hewitt, 1934, Homopus bergeri Lindholm, 1906, Homopus verreauxii Boulenger, 1889, Peltastes verreauxii Gray, 1870, Psammobates depressa Fitzsimons, 1938, Psammobates tentorius verroxii (Smith, 1839), Testudo bergeri Siebenrock, 1909, Testudo boettgeri Siebenrock, 1909, Testudo fiski Boulenger, 1886, Testudo oscar-boettgeri Lindholm, 1929, Testudo seimundi Boulenger, 1903, Testudo smithi bergeri Mertens & Wermuth, 1955, Testudo smithi Boulenger, 1886, Testudo tentoria Bell, 1828, Testudo tentorius verroxii Smith, 1839, Testudo trimeni Boulenger, 1886, Testudo verreauxii Boulenger, 1889, Testudo verroxii bergeri Mertens, 1955, Testudo verroxii Smith, 1839, Chersinella tentoria hexensis Hewitt, 1933, Psammobates tentorius Fritz & Bininda-Emonds, 2007, Psammobates tentorius tentorius (Bell, 1828), Psammobates tentorius trimeni (Boulenger, 1886), Testudo geometrica nigriventris Gray, 1855, endemic

Notes

References

South African animal biodiversity lists